= Effects of Hurricane Hugo in the Caribbean =

Hurricane Hugo
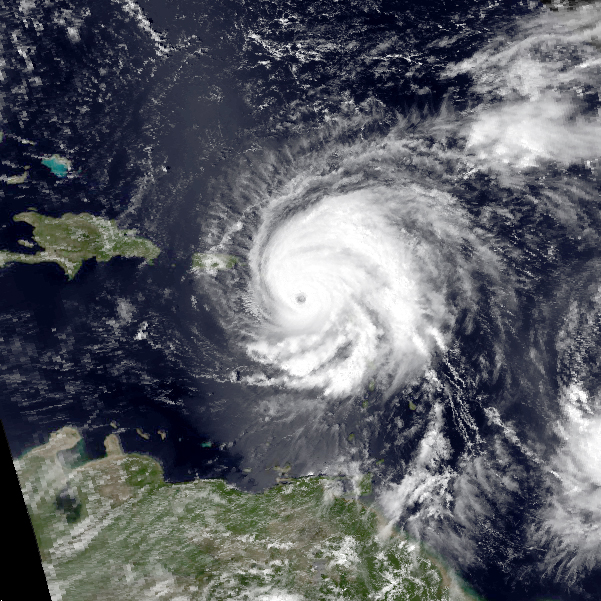
- Hurricane Hugo traversing the Caribbean on 17 September

Meteorological history
- Duration: 16–21 September 1989

Category 4 major hurricane
- 1-minute sustained (SSHWS/NWS)
- Highest winds: 140 mph (220 km/h)

Overall effects
- Fatalities: 46
- Damage: $4.01 billion (1989 USD)
- Areas affected: Lesser Antilles, Virgin Islands, Puerto Rico, Dominican Republic
- Part of the 1989 Atlantic hurricane season

Hurricane Hugo brought major devastation to the Caribbean during the 1989 Atlantic hurricane season.

== Preparations ==
Barbados served as a staging area for disaster response in the Caribbean due to its strategic position in the region and distance away from Hugo's forecast impacts. Several relief agencies had convened in Barbados earlier in 1989 to coordinate hurricane response plans. These agencies were mobilised ahead of Hugo's arrival in the Lesser Antilles. They were joined by additional teams from the United States Agency for International Development and the U.S. Office of Foreign Disaster Assistance (OFDA). Additional relief teams from the OFDA, Pan American Health Organization, Red Cross, and United Nations Office of the United Nations Disaster Relief Coordinator were pre-positioned in Antigua to survey the damage and prioritise aid in Hugo's aftermath. Civil defence officials in Dominica and Guadeloupe prepared shelters to house evacuees. Non-critical patients at Princess Margaret Hospital in Roseau, Dominica were sent home beginning on 15 September to free space for possible hurricane victims. The government of Dominica urged its citizens to take emergency precautions. The Dominican Ministry of Public Works prepositioned earthmoving equipment around Dominica to clear landslide debris. A curfew in Guadeloupe mandating that streets be clear of pedestrians and vehicles came into effect at 6 p.m. AST on 17 September. Leading up to the curfew, residents rushed hardware stores and supermarkets to stock up on supplies. Many on the Atlantic-facing side of Guadeloupe evacuated farther inland. Cable television played a significant role in keeping residents of Martinique updated on the hurricane's approach. Though no formal evacuation order was enacted for Martinique, the prefect of Martinique recommended the evacuation of the low-lying Kinsale area on 16 September. Twenty-four evacuation shelters were opened throughout the island. Disaster preparedness plans were set into motion by Martinique's government ministries, dispatching crews to board windows and secure buildings. Air France cancelled its three Martinique-bound flights from Paris scheduled for 18 September; flights to the Lesser Antilles were largely cancelled by the afternoon of 16 September. Most buildings in Antigua were shuttered by noon on 17 September and all local ships were brought to their moorings. V. C. Bird International Airport closed and the island's electric grid was turned off.

Across both Puerto Rico and the Virgin Islands, 217 shelters were opened; over 161,000 people sought refuge in these shelters. Although warnings from the NHC afforded ample time for preparations, shelters were required to be provisioned longer than in typical hurricanes. Some of these shelters took heavy damage during Hugo, and one required evacuation by civil defence authorities after its windows gave way to the wind. Shelters in Saint Croix housed 1,000 evacuees. Operations at Cyril E. King Airport in Saint Thomas were suspended on the afternoon of 17 September. Banks, courts, government offices, and schools were also closed throughout the region. Evacuations in Puerto Rico began at dawn on 17 September and were completed in eight hours. Most of the 166 shelters opened in Puerto Rico were public schools. More than 2,000 troops from the United States National Guard were mobilised in Puerto Rico; in San Juan, National Guardsmen and volunteers drove around the city issuing emergency instructions over loudspeakers.

At least 30,000 people evacuated in Puerto Rico, making it one of the largest evacuations in the territory's history; government and media representatives described the evacuation as "the best coordinated weather event they could recall." Three thousand people evacuated from southeastern Puerto Rico and five thousand evacuated from San Juan neighbourhoods. However, many were initially reluctant to leave. La Perla was evacuated for the first time in living memory. Hundreds of evacuees were brought to a stadium in Mayagüez. The Luis Muñoz Marín International Airport terminated all scheduled flights at 6 p.m. AST on 17 September. All international airlines evacuated their aircraft from Puerto Rico, though one Airbus A300 owned by American Airlines was left behind for emergency use. Tourists left en masse on departing flights before the airport terminated operations. Cruise ships with San Juan as their port of call were rerouted elsewhere. One person was killed in Utuado, Puerto Rico, after being electrocuted by a power line while preparing for the storm. On 18 September, Puerto Rican Governor Rafael Hernández Colón ordered a shutdown of the island's electric grid to mitigate damage. A state of emergency was declared in the Dominican Republic on 18 September. Four international airports were closed that day and businesses began to fortify against Hugo's effects. Civil defence officials aided preparations in Puerto Plata and evacuated a beach there. A Boeing 727 charter evacuated 135 vacationers from the city.

Buildings were boarded up in Nassau, Bahamas, and classes were cancelled at The College of The Bahamas on 18 September.

== Impact ==
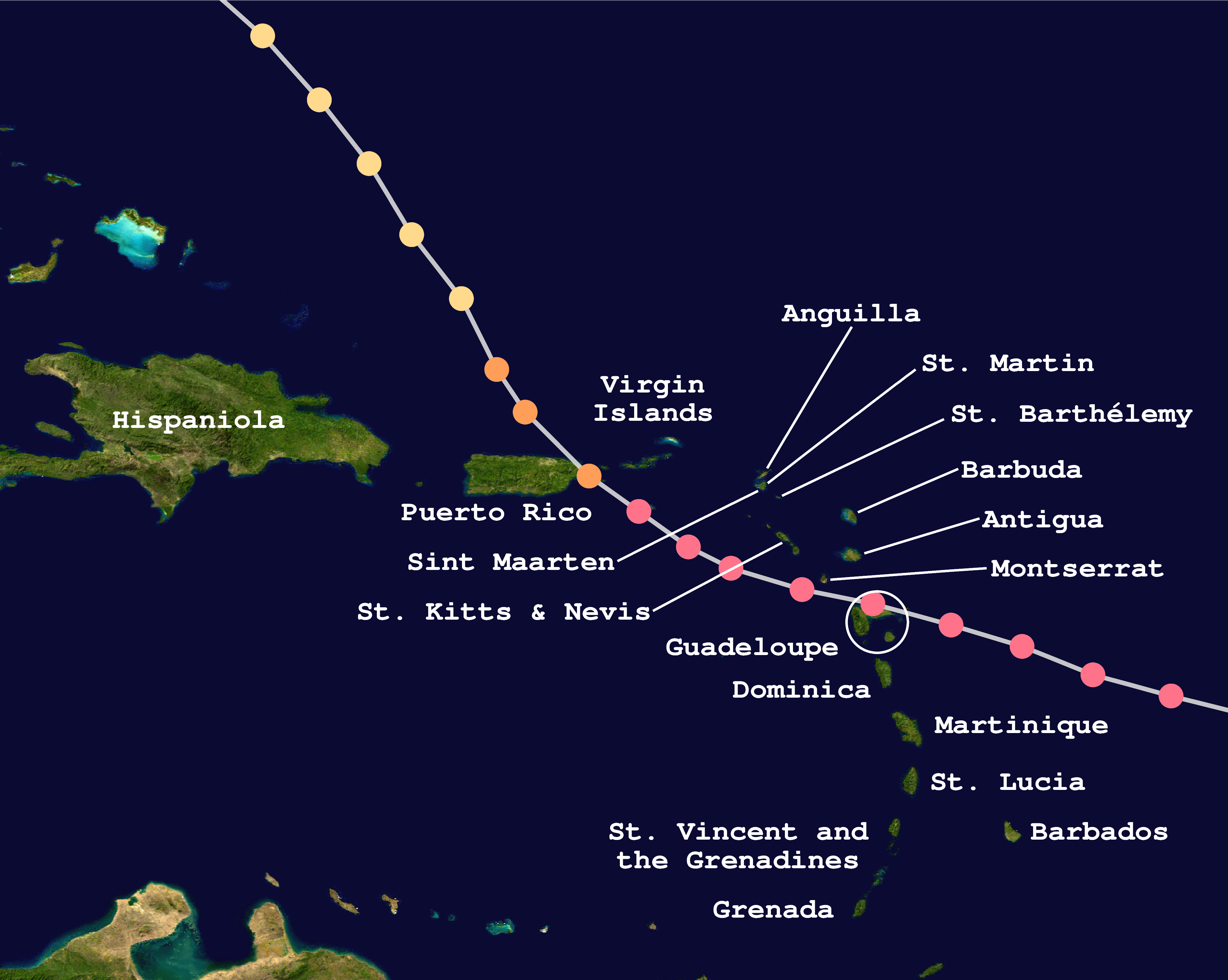
Hugo's path in the Caribbean

Hugo was the strongest storm to traverse the northeastern Caribbean since Hurricane David in 1979. The Sea, Lake, and Overland Surge from Hurricanes (SLOSH) model estimated that storm surge from Hugo led to coastal water levels 3–4 ft (0.91–1.22 m) above normal tidal heights along Saint Croix and the eastern end of Puerto Rico. These equated to storm surge heights of around 7–8 ft (2.1–2.4 m). Water levels of 2–3 ft (0.61–0.91 m) above normal were estimated to have occurred along the northern coast of Puerto Rico. Rainfall on the Caribbean islands averaged between 5–10 in (130–250 mm). The NHC's preliminary report on the hurricane enumerated 28 fatalities in the eastern Caribbean while media reports tallied over 30. As many as 100,000 people may have been left homeless throughout the region as a result of Hugo.

Guadeloupe and Montserrat were hardest-hit among the Leeward Islands, and collectively suffered over $1 billion in damage and recorded 21 fatalities. Though less severe, widespread damage was also inflicted by Hugo across the remainder of the Leeward and Windward Islands. Extensive flooding occurred on Antigua, and power outages befell the island after utility poles were uprooted by the storm. The damage was heaviest towards the southern portions of the island as the center of Hugo passed 50 mi (80 km) south. There were two deaths and 181 injuries. Another 509 people were left homeless following damage wrought to 15 percent of homes. Partial damage was documented on 1,500 homes and total loss was documented on 106. Thirty per cent of fishing vessels were also damaged by the hurricane, equating to thousands of boats. The total cost of damage reached nearly EC$200 million. Hugo's damage toll in Saint Kitts and Nevis amounted to $46 million, largely sustained by shoreline structures and crops. This equated to 32 percent of the country's gross domestic product. Homes, government buildings, and trees were damaged by the storm. A fifth of the country was rendered homeless and the entire populace lost power and water. Ninety per cent of the residents of Nevis lost their homes. One person was killed after a wall collapsed upon him.

Dominica was most affected among the Windward Islands. Hugo ruined 80 percent of the island's banana crop and interrupted water supplies. Coastal roads were damaged by the hurricane's choppy seas; a washout along a primary thoroughfare isolated the village of Dubique. Bridges and storm drains also took heavy damage. Landslides isolated towns for many days. The damage toll in Dominica totalled $20 million. Winds in Martinique reached 60 mph (97 km/h) on the Caravelle peninsula. Some banana plantations near Macouba were damaged, though wind-related damage in Martinique was otherwise minimal. Moderate rains, peaking at 5.67 inches (144 mm) in La Médaille, led to some mudslides. Rough seas flooded parts of Fort-de-France and damaged piers along the Alfassa Boulevard. Beach erosion also occurred along Martinique beaches.

The hurricane moved near the Virgin Islands and made two landfalls in Puerto Rico as it egressed the Caribbean, causing considerable destruction. Estimates of the damage toll in this region vary but include over $50 million each for the British Virgin Islands and Netherlands Antilles, $2 billion for Puerto Rico, and $500 million for Saint Croix. Hugo's center was 85 mi (137 km) southwest of Sint Maarten at its closest approach; a station there reported a maximum sustained wind 46 mph (74 km/h) and a peak gust of 78 mph (126 km/h). These winds unroofed homes and uprooted trees and power lines. Roughly 25 sailboats sustained severe damage and one boat with four people went missing. Sint Eustatius and Saba of the Netherlands Antilles lost much of their vegetation. Many homes, piers, and public buildings suffered severe damage on the two islands. Eleven people were killed in the Netherlands Antilles and caused $50 million in damage there. The damage toll in the British Virgin Islands exceeded $50 million, with the loss of at least half of the islands' agriculture. Around 30 percent of homes were unroofed. Power outages affected the British Virgin Islands. The Associated Press reported "numerous injuries" and "scores of homes destroyed" on Tortola, the largest island in the BVI. A third of the island's private homes were wrecked. The hurricane also caused widespread power outages in the Dominican Republic while tracking northwest towards the continental United States.

=== Guadeloupe ===
Guadeloupe sustained the heaviest impacts among the Leeward Islands from Hugo. The hurricane made landfall on the island at 05:00 UTC on 17 September (01:00 a.m. AST) as a Category 4 hurricane with sustained winds at 140 mph (230 km/h). This made Hugo the strongest hurricane to strike Guadeloupe since a hurricane each in 1899 and 1928. A minimum air pressure of 941.1 mbar (hPa; 27.79 inHg) was recorded at La Désirade and 943 mbar in Raizet, with a 97-mile-per-hour (156 km/h) wind gust documented in the last weather observation transmitted from Pointe-à-Pitre. A ship in the wharf at Pointe-à-Pitre estimated a gust of 184 mph (296 km/h). Though unmeasured, French meteorological service Météo-France estimates that wind gusts may have reached 200 mph (320 km/h). The effects of Hugo lasted for about 12 hours in Guadeloupe, with the strongest winds occurring within a 3-hour window. Rainfall totals ranged from 3.1 inches (79 mm) along the southern part of Guadeloupe to 13.8 inches (350 mm) in more mountainous areas. Hourly rainfall rates averaged roughly 2 inches (51 mm) per hour in the core of the hurricane. A station in Gardel documented 3.66 inches (93 mm) of rain in one hour. Along Grand Cul-de-Sac Marin, storm surge from Hugo elevated the seas from 8 to 10 ft (2.4 to 3.0 m) above mean sea level.

Telecommunications were knocked out by the storm throughout Guadeloupe as winds brought down power and telephone lines. The island of La Désirade completely lost radio contact with the outside world. Three thousand houses, predominantly wooden shanties, were unroofed. Approximately half of Pointe-a-Pitre, Guadeloupe's largest city, was destroyed. Part of the control tower at Pointe-à-Pitre International Airport was wrecked and the airport's radio antenna was knocked down. Lower sections of Sainte-Rose were inundated by storm surge, resulting in considerable damage. However, the storm's trajectory relative to Guadeloupe prevented a more damaging surge event from occurring. Saint-François was largely destroyed, with nearly half of houses remaining. Several tourist hotels there sustained heavy damage. Two people were killed in Le Moule, that been damaged at nearly 80 percent. The entirety of Guadeloupe's banana crop and most of its coconut palms and sugar cane crops were ruined by Hugo. The storm also wiped out most of the island's fishing fleet, and many ships were grounded by 24-foot (7.3 m) waves. Debris blocked 70 percent of roads. There were 11 fatalities attributed to Hugo in Guadeloupe. Another 107 people were injured and 35,000 were rendered homeless. The damage toll in Guadeloupe amounted to $880 million.

=== Montserrat ===
Although Montserrat was struck by many significant storms in the 18th and 19th centuries, the last major hurricane to strike the island before Hugo occurred in 1928. The right-front quadrant of Hugo's eyewall moved over Montserrat on 17 September, raking the island with sustained winds of 140 mph (230 km/h). The island may have also experienced wind gusts up to 240 mph (390 km/h). The hurricane exacted a heavy toll over the course of 14 hours. Hugo was the costliest hurricane in Montserrat's history, inflicting $260 million in damage. Entire villages were destroyed by the storm and vegetation was stripped bare. Most houses on the island were razed or seriously damaged, displacing 11,000 of Montserrat's 12,000 residents. At least minor damage was dealt to nearly every building on the island, with severe damage inflicted on half of all buildings. Approximately ninety per cent of homes suffered either major to total roof loss, with the most severe damage occurring in the Kinsale and St. Patrick's areas. Impacts on upscale hotels contributed to the overall loss of 88 percent of hotel rooms on the island. Structural and water damage was sustained by hotels.

All government buildings and schools in Montserrat were impacted. The headquarters of the Montserrat government lost much of its roof. Air traffic control facilities at W. H. Bramble Airport were destroyed and the airport terminal was seriously damaged. The 180-foot (55 m) stone jetty at Plymouth was destroyed by Hugo's 20-foot (6.1 m) waves. Livingstone's port was destroyed. Damage to the fishing sector, including ships, buildings, and equipment, totalled US$5.1 million. The island's power grid was left entirely dysfunctional following the storm across both high and low voltage distribution networks. All supply lines and the generator operated by Molec, Montserrat's electricity company, were incapacitated. All major communications facilities were destroyed. Heavy rainfall with accumulations of up to 7 in (180 mm) triggered mudslides; one at the foot of Chances Peak wrecked 21 homes. Radio and microwave transmission towers atop the mountain were toppled and twisted by the hurricane. Strong winds also downed thousands of trees and utility poles. Ten people were killed in Montserrat and 89 others were injured.

=== United States Virgin Islands ===
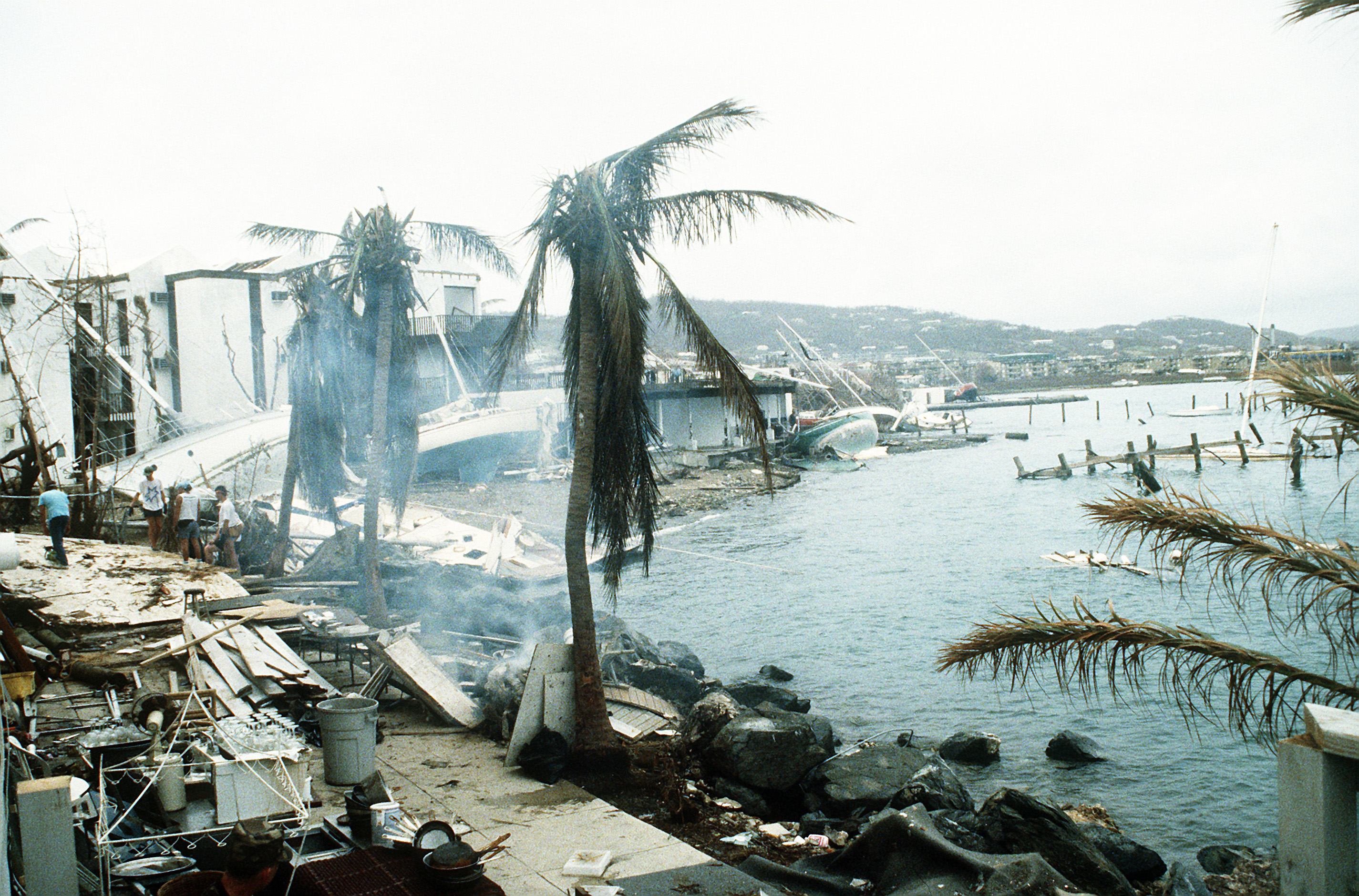
Ninety percent of buildings in Saint Croix were damaged

Hugo was the first significant hurricane to strike the Virgin Islands and Puerto Rico region since Hurricane Betsy in 1956. Hugo tracked through the Virgin Islands on 18 September and destroyed 30 percent of homes in the archipelago. Generally 6–9 in (150–230 mm) of rain fell across the Virgin Islands, peaking at 11.2 in (280 mm) at Hams Bluff Light in northwestern Saint Croix. However, most rain gauges in the Virgin Islands were destroyed by the hurricane.

The eye of Hugo passed over Saint Croix at 06:00 UTC on 18 September (02:00 a.m. AST). Hurricane-force winds lasted for an unusually long time, battering the island from the late evening of 17 September to the morning of 18 September. Peak sustained winds in Hugo at the time were estimated at 140 mph (230 km/h), making it a Category 4 hurricane. The winds unroofed homes and knocked out power in Saint Croix and Saint Thomas. No official wind measurements were taken on Saint Croix as weather observers evacuated their post at Alexander Hamilton International Airport (now known as Henry E. Rholsen International Airport); the extent of the damage suggested that the entire island was within the envelope of the hurricane's strongest winds. Anemometers on two U.S. Navy workboats recorded peak gusts of 161 and 168 mph (259 and 270 km/h). Unofficial reports alleged that Saint Croix experienced gusts in excess of 200 mph (320 km/h), but these were inconsistent with the severity of damage or were otherwise unsubstantiated.

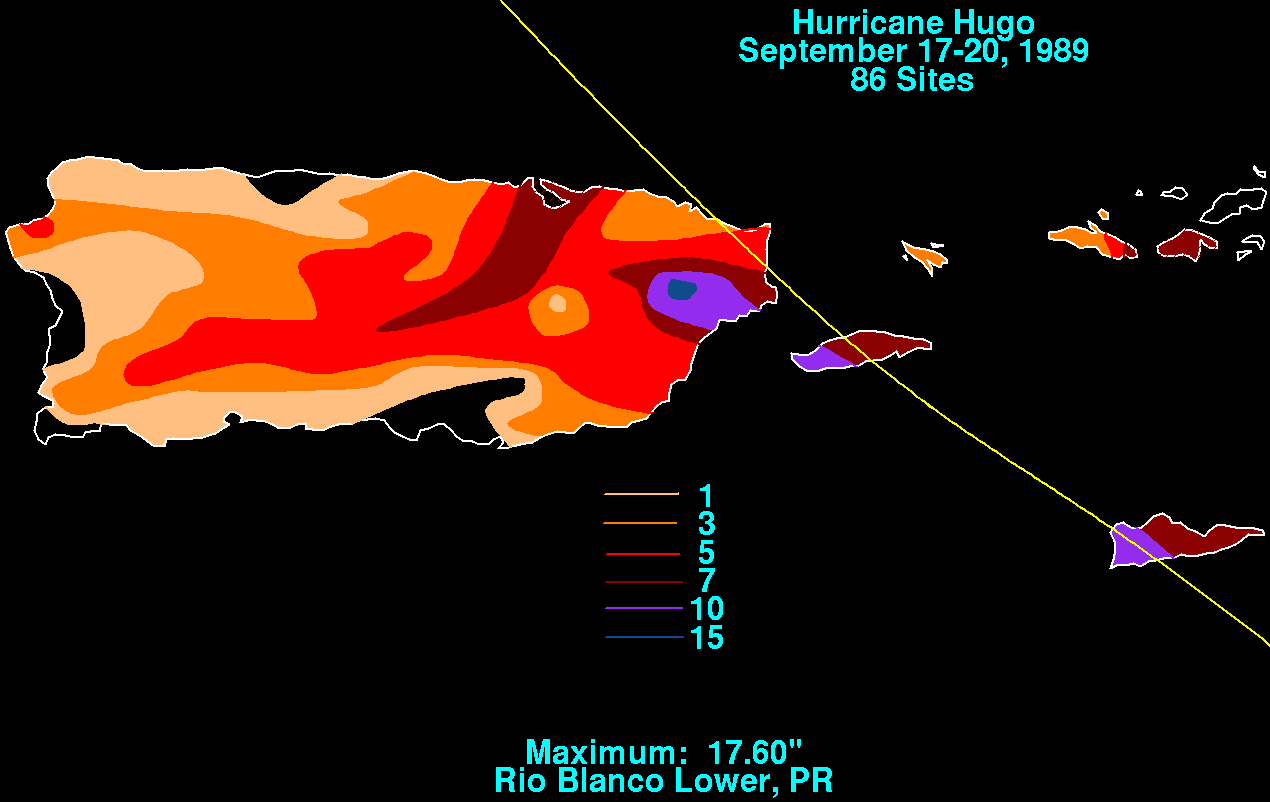
Rainfall totals in Puerto Rico and the U.S. Virgin Islands

Hugo killed three people and left 3,500 homeless on Saint Croix. Private and government property damage exceeded $500 million. Electricity, power, and water services were cut by Hugo across the island. More than 90 percent of buildings were damaged and vegetation was stripped bare throughout the island. Seventy per cent of buildings were destroyed and as many as 75 percent of homes lost their roofs. Many neighbourhoods were completely reduced to rubble. Surveys equated the severity of damage to that caused by an F1 or F2 tornado on the Fujita scale. In some areas, microbursts and the local topography may have amplified the winds, producing more extreme damage. The heaviest damage on Saint Croix was inflicted upon its northern coast from the mouth of the Salt River to the island's eastern end. These coastal extents were directly exposed to intense rainbands associated with Hugo. The sloping terrain near Christiansted accelerated winds near the surface by as much as 20 percent, enhancing the damage wrought. Stores were damaged in Christiansted. Power and water distillation facilities operated by the Virgin Islands Water & Power Authority west of the city were disabled by the storm. The rupture of a fuel oil tank on the facility grounds caused an oil spill in the Christiansted harbour. Severe damage occurred in south-central Saint Croix near the Hovensa oil refinery and Alexander Hamilton International Airport. Oil tanks at the refinery were damaged, leaving the entire facility incapacitated. The control tower, associated weather instrumentation, and aircraft at the airport were badly damaged. A loose steel fuel tank collided into and destroyed a U.S. Customs shed. A UH-1 helicopter and two heavy trucks belonging to the National Guard were destroyed by debris. Less severe damage occurred in southwestern Saint Croix near Frederiksted. Rough surf damaged the city pier, tearing away parts of its concrete decking.

Saint Thomas experienced hurricane-force winds and sustained widespread damage to property and vegetation; damage was less severe than on Saint Croix due to Saint Thomas's position farther away from the core of Hugo. A field survey conducted by the National Academy of Sciences estimated that gusts of up to 121 mph (195 km/h) occurred on the island. Homes were unroofed and boats were heavily damaged or set adrift. The studios and transmitter facilities of television station WBNB-TV in Charlotte Amalie were destroyed; the station would not return to the air because of the damage and the owner's inability to afford repairs.

=== Puerto Rico ===
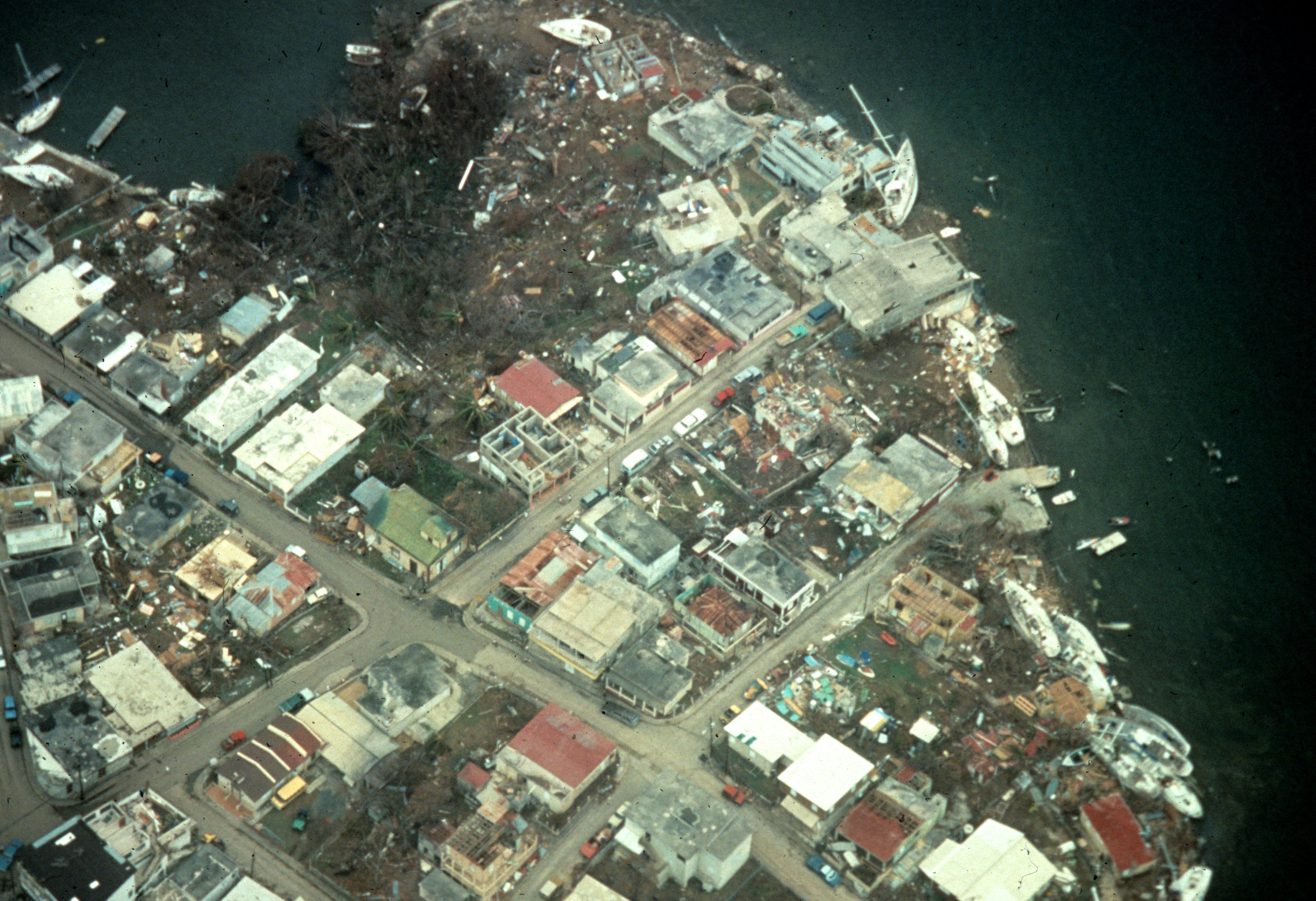
Aerial view of Culebra, Puerto Rico, after Hugo's passage

Two people drowned in Puerto Rico during Hugo's passage according to reports from the National Research Council and NHC. Another six were killed in Guayama. The San Juan Star estimated losses in the territory amounted to $2 billion while Storm Data, a monthly publication from the National Centers for Environmental Information, estimated that damage reached $1 billion; property damage accounted for $900 million while crop damage accounted for $100 million. The outer rainbands of Hugo began moving across Puerto Rico at 5:00 p.m. AST (21:00 UTC) on 17 September. Hugo made two landfalls in the Puerto Rico territory on 18 September—on Vieques and Fajardo—as a high-end Category 3 hurricane with maximum sustained winds estimated at 125 mph (201 km/h). An anemometer on the ship Night Cap registered a wind gust of 170 mph (270 km/h) while harboured at Culebra. The strongest wind recorded on Puerto Rico's main island was documented at Roosevelt Roads Naval Station, which reported a peak sustained wind of 104 mph (167 km/h) punctuated by a 120 mph (190 km/h) wind gust. At Luis Muñoz Marín International Airport, sustained winds reached 77 mph (124 km/h), gusting to 92 mph (148 km/h). The heaviest rain from Hugo in Puerto Rico occurred in the northeastern part of the island due to the hurricane's trajectory and orographic lifting induced by El Yunque. A peak rainfall total of 17.60 in (447 mm) was recorded along the lower Río Blanco. Flooding was mostly limited to the northeastern corner of Puerto Rico and in San Juan where rainfall was heaviest. In these areas, over 10 in (250 mm) of rain fell in 48 hours. The heavy rainfall drained into the Fajardo River and Mameyes River, causing them to set new records for discharge rates; three other rivers reached discharge rates within 10–15 percent of their highest on record. Flash floods occurred near the Pitahaya and Espíritu Santo rivers. Floods impacted areas near Luqillo and low-lying portions of San Juan after water pumps lost power. Two hundred landslides occurred in Puerto Rico, with the largest of these transporting 40,000 m^{3} (1,400,000 ft^{3}) of debris into a river.

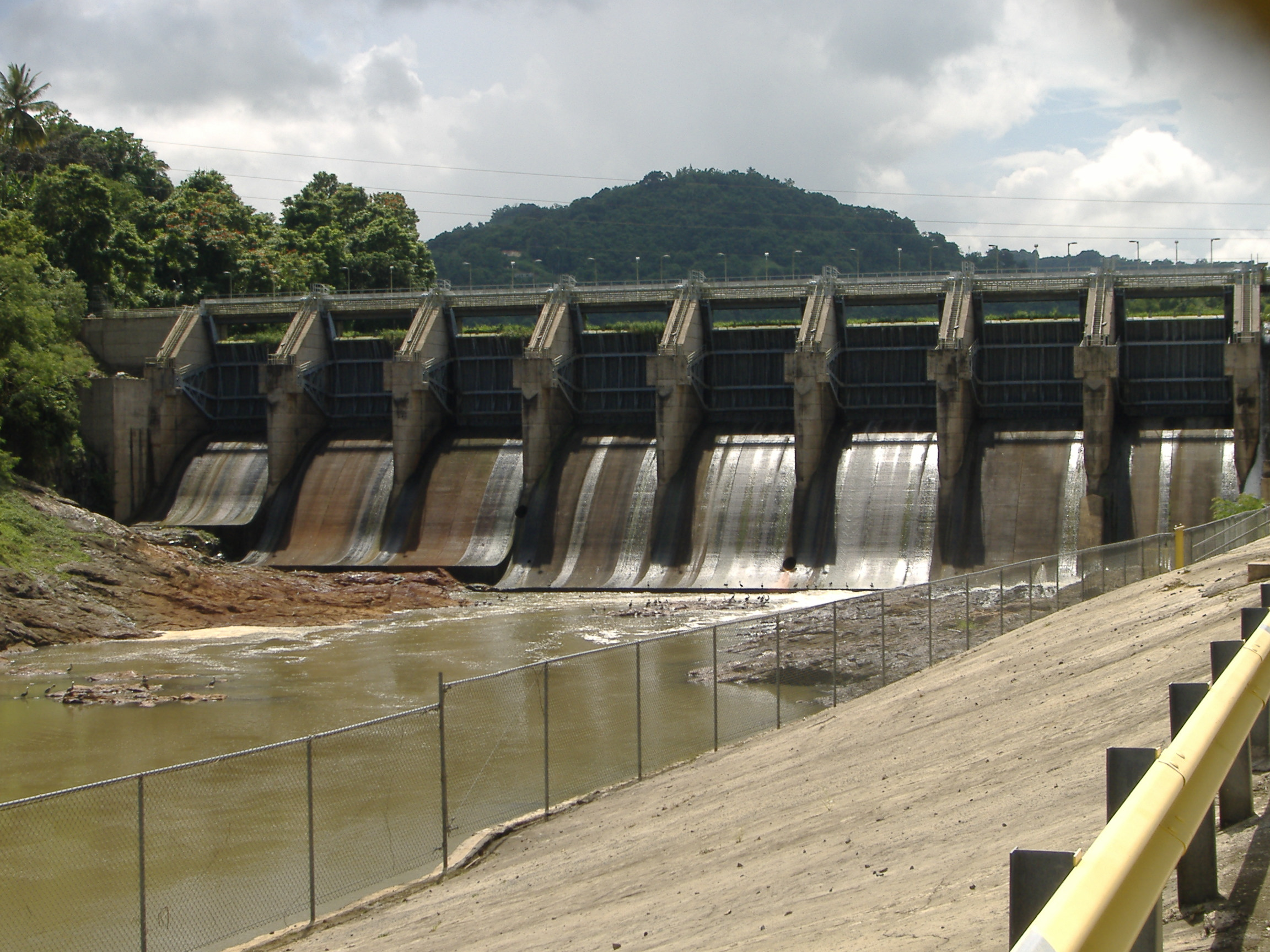
Electric motors at Carraízo Dam were flooded, disrupting water service to San Juan

Culebra and Vieques, two small islands east of Puerto Rico, experienced harsher impacts than the main island; between the two, Culebra experienced stronger winds and heavier damage. The devastation in both islands was nonetheless thorough and widespread. Hurricane reconnaissance observations and the resulting damage in Culebra suggested that the island was struck by 150-mph (240 km/h) wind gusts. Southeasterly winds were accelerated by the hills on the sides of Ensenada Honda. The homes of 80 percent of Culebra residents were wrecked. A housing development near the Benjamín Rivera Noriega Airport was completely destroyed. Many boats in Culebra were damaged, including those that sought refuge in Ensenada Honda. On Vieques, a peak gust of 98 mph (158 km/h) was registered, though the damage suggested that gusts of up to 132 mph (212 km/h) may have impacted the island. The roof of a baseball stadium was pried off by the winds. A thousand families in Vieques were left homeless.

The worst damage on the principal island of Puerto Rico occurred along its northeast coast at Fajardo and Luquillo, where the angle of attack of Hugo's winds was most favourable for high storm surge. At Luquillo, the storm surge reached 8 ft (2.4 m), with waves atop the elevated waters reaching at least 10 ft (3.0 m). Two ferries were grounded at Fajardo by the storm surge; boats sustained over $50 million in losses while marinas sustained $25 million in damage. An aerial survey from the U.S. Coast Guard found that winds unroofed 80 percent of homes between San Juan and Fajardo. Roosevelt Roads Naval Station took heavy damage and lost power and water service. Practically every building was damaged, though only minor injuries occurred. High waves along the coast of the San Juan metropolitan area destroyed walls and pavements. Condado suffered widespread damage and debris bestrewed its streets. A mobile home park in Loíza, one of the few in Puerto Rico, was wiped out by the storm surge and strong winds. The winds overturned cars and toppled trees and streetlights around the city. Buildings in downtown San Juan suffered partial wall and window failures, though overall damage to buildings in the city was light. Fifty aeroplanes were destroyed at Luis Muñoz Marín International Airport; repairs to the airport would cost $20 million.

Power outages affected 80 percent of Puerto Rico. Power and water supplies in San Juan were cut for more than a week in some areas. At Carraízo Dam, San Juan's primary supplier of water, five electric motors in the pumping station were inundated, disrupting water distribution; replacement of these motors cost $200,000. The lake formed by the dam had begun to rise, and floodgates were rendered inoperable by power outages. Poor maintenance had left the dam vulnerable to a larger catastrophe; however, Hugo's rainfall was ultimately less than forecast. Power distribution systems in San Juan and other communities were severely crippled, leading to power outages affecting thirty-five municipalities. Many power poles in Puerto Rico held a disproportionate number of electrical conductors, resulting in greater power loss than would otherwise be expected for the conditions experienced. A destroyed communications antenna in El Yunque National Forest cut off communication to Vieques and Culebra. Debris in the forest blocked Puerto Rico Highway 191 and strong winds unroofed the local headquarters of the United States Forest Service. Fallen power lines and damage to over 120 homes marooned the mayor of Arroyo and several others; the municipality had been struck by waves 35 ft (11 m) high. Damage to highways in Puerto Rico amounted to $40 million, though only one bridge required closure for repairs. Crops on the island including banana and coffee sustained widespread losses.

== Aftermath ==
=== Lesser Antilles ===
A plane bearing 60 rescue workers and emergency supplies was sent to Guadeloupe from Paris on 19 September, with two more relief aircraft held on standby. The crews were tasked with sheltering the homeless, restoring electricity service, and clearing roads. Doctors were also sent to Guadeloupe from La Meynard Hospital in Martinique. Emergency supplies from Paris were gathered by Catholic Air and Red Cross. Military aircraft delivered 50 tons (45 tonnes) of supplies and over 500 emergency workers to Guadeloupe, along with Minister of Overseas France Louis Le Pensec; 3,000 soldiers also accompanied the transport. The total cost of repairs on the island was estimated at over €610 million. Two days after Hugo's passage, an Aérospatiale SA 330 Puma rescue helicopter crashed in La Désirade, killing nine people. The Guadeloupe government held a competition to design homes that would be quickly built to house the island's homeless population; five of thirty models were selected, and the first homes were built five months after Hugo. The banana industry in Guadeloupe required FF466 million to recover, while the island's hotel industry suffered FF152 million in losses.

The emergency operations center in Montserrat was formally activated on 18 September to effectively deal with the aftermath of Hugo. As more robust communication systems were destroyed by the storm, communications between the island and the outside world were primarily handled by amateur radio. Urgent requests for aid were forwarded by ham radio operators to all embassies and foreign missions in Barbados. The island's reduced radio capabilities were augmented by HMS Alacrity when she arrived in Plymouth on 18 September. The ship also brought a helicopter and a crew of 100 sailors that aided in cleaning up roads between Plymouth and W. H. Bramble Airport. Extensive effort was required to clean up Montserrat's roads due to the prevalence of debris. Along with the crew of the Alacrity, the Barbados Defence Force and Jamaica Defence Force also assisted in road clean-up operations in Montserrat. The International Rescue Corps maintained a satellite communications link and provided support for 21 national and international organisations in recovery efforts. Rationing on petroleum was enforced, with a limit of four gallons (15 liters) per person. Waterborne illnesses in Hugo's aftermath proved fatal in Montserrat. A temporary hospital was established at the Montserrat Government House following the destruction of a recently completed hospital.

=== United States Virgin Islands ===
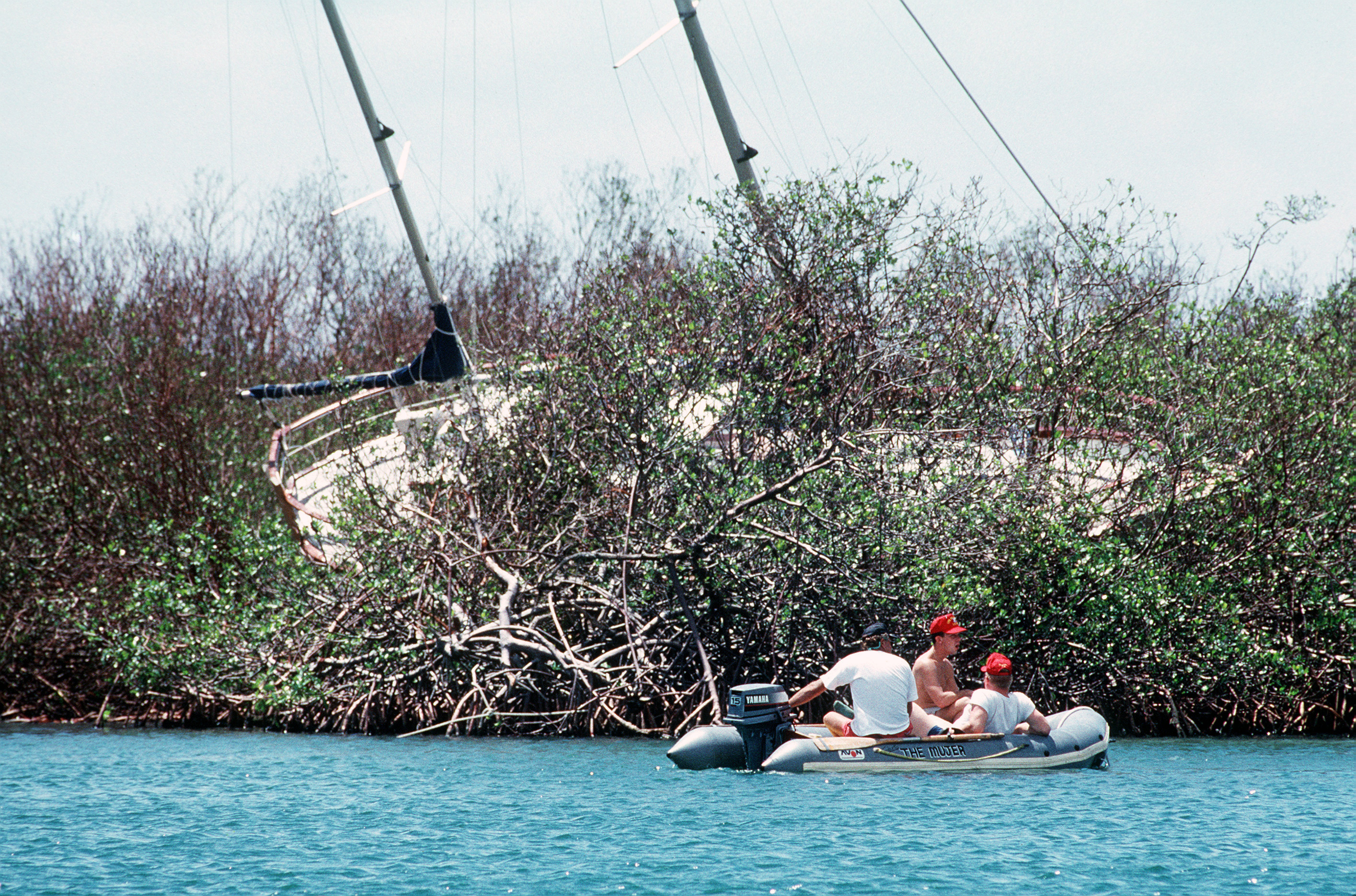
Relief crews attending a beached sailboat in Saint Croix

President Bush declared the U.S. Virgin Islands a disaster area. A temporary air traffic control tower was erected at Alexander Hamilton Airport in Saint Croix six days after the storm. Cyril E. King Airport in Saint Thomas, having suffered less damage, resumed operations within 24 hours. Power was restored in most of Saint Croix and Saint Thomas within three months. The islands' telephone systems were badly crippled by the storm, and only limited service was restored to businesses in December 1989. Some private residences in Saint Croix remained without telephone service until March 1990. Between 300–500 prisoners were freed from prison in Saint Croix after the storm, either by escaping or by release due to food and water shortages in the prison. The Federal Emergency Management Agency (FEMA) dispatched a C-141 airlifter with government relief workers and communications equipment to Saint Croix. The demographics of the Virgin Islands a year after Hugo reflected the hurricane's impact: roughly 10% of Saint Croix's populace did not return to the island within a year of Hugo. A smaller exodus occurred at Saint Thomas and Saint John.

Three days after the storm hit, the Governor of the United States Virgin Islands Alexander Farrelly asked President Bush for federal assistance in restoring order to the island. On the island of Saint Croix, looting and lawlessness reigned in the aftermath of Hugo. FBI agents, U.S. marshals, and local police initially maintained a patrol of Frederiksted and Christiansted while the U.S. Coast Guard evacuated tourists from the island; the USCGC Bear evacuated 40 people and sent personnel onshore to monitor the situation. However, local law enforcement in Saint Croix was unable to stop widespread looting, with armed gangs reportedly taking root the streets of Christiansted. The Atlanta Constitution reported that some members of the local police and National Guard also took part in looting. For the first time since the Baltimore riot of 1968, American troops were deployed in response to a domestic civil disturbance; with the authorisation of U.S. President George H. W. Bush under the Insurrection Act of 1807, the Pentagon sent 1,100 troops and federal marshals to augment the security presence as local police and the National Guard lost control of the situation. Among the deployments were 470 troops from the 16th Military Police Brigade, 560 troops from the 503rd Military Police Battalion, and three helicopters and medical support. Dubbed Operation Hawkeye, the operation involved elements of the Army, Navy and the Coast Guard, along with a contingent from the U.S. Marshals Service and the FBI, forming Joint Task Force (JTF) 40 for Operation Hawkeye. It also resulted in the first operational deployment of the National Disaster Medical System (NDMS), when the New Mexico-1 Disaster Medical Assistance Team (DMAT) was deployed to assist in medical care needs of the stricken island. The first contingent arrived in Saint Croix on the morning of 21 September to secure an airfield and devise the command structure for the other arriving troops.

National Basketball Association player Tim Duncan, born in Christiansted and a two-time NBA MVP, of the San Antonio Spurs attributed his basketball career to Hurricane Hugo's destruction. When Tim was 13 years old, he was a competitive swimmer who was considered one of the top United States competitors for the 400-meter freestyle. However, in the aftermath of Hugo, every swimming pool on Saint Croix was destroyed, including the Olympic-size swimming pool. With no pool to practice in, Duncan turned to basketball. Tim Duncan said, "I'm very fortunate to be where I am today. Without Hugo, I might still be swimming." On 4 April 2020, it was announced that Duncan would be inducted into the Naismith Memorial Basketball Hall of Fame on 29 August.

=== Puerto Rico ===
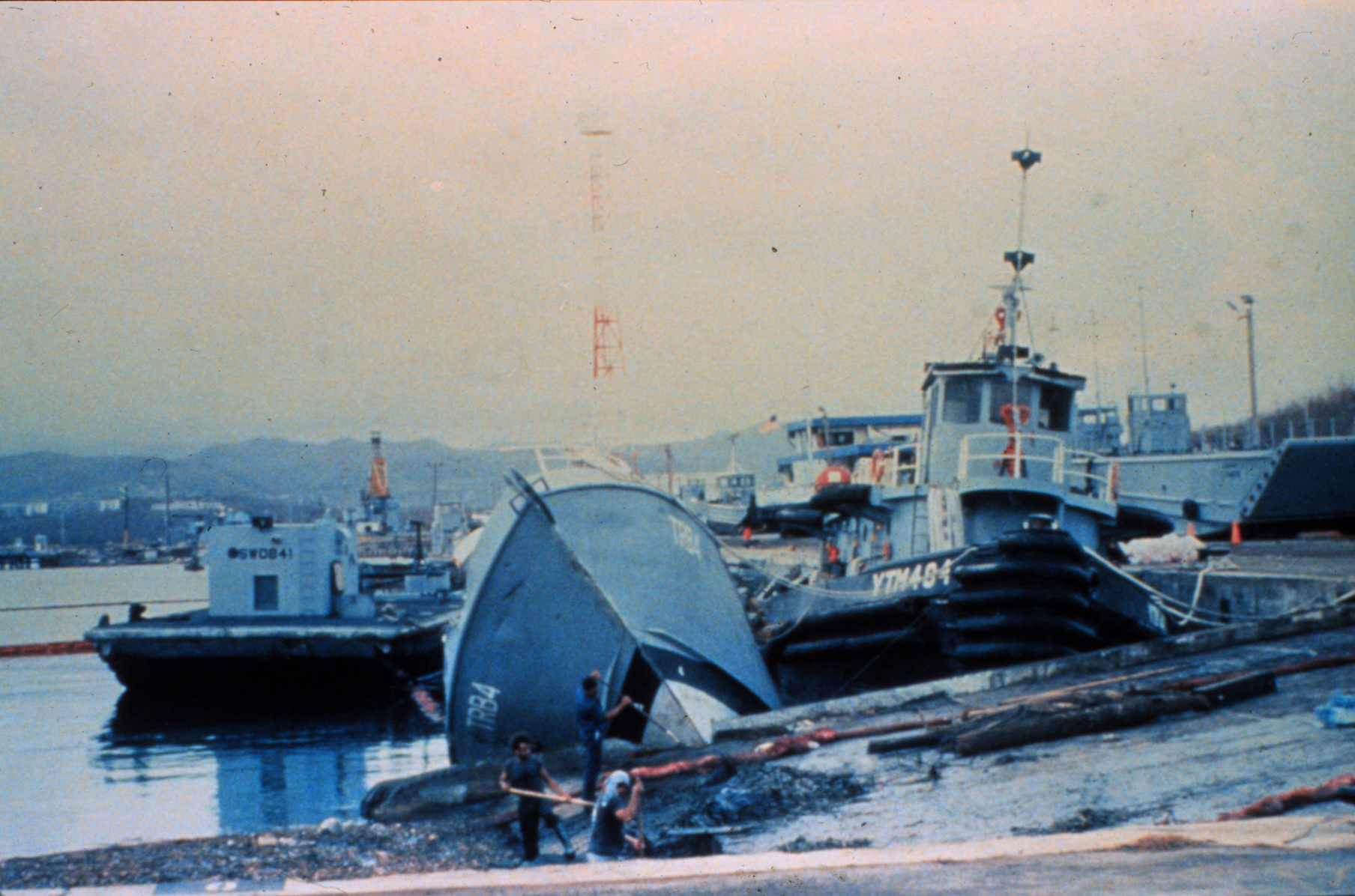
Damage to small vessels at Roosevelt Roads Naval Base in Ceiba, Puerto Rico, by Hurricane Hugo

Puerto Rican Governor Hernandez Colón solicited a disaster declaration for Puerto Rico from President Bush after surveying the damage wrought by Hugo. The U.S. Department of the Interior allocated $500,000 in aid to Puerto Rico and the U.S. Virgin Islands. Police were dispatched to retail areas, offices of political parties, and the main San Juan post office to avert looting. An emergency clinic served in place of the destroyed hospital in Culebra. Governor Colón estimated that the number of those displaced by Hugo in Puerto Rico exceeded 50,000. Over 25,000 people in Culebra and Vieques remained in shelters after Hugo as their homes were destroyed. The Puerto Rican school system was hindered by the damage inflicted on the schools themselves, their use as shelters, and the loss of water and power service. Due to a lack of planning for housing shelter residents, 500 schools remained closed weeks after the storm, affecting at least 150,000 students. The loss of water caused two hospitals to refuse patient admission on 20 September.

While power in San Juan was largely restored within 48 hours, many in Puerto Rico remained without power in the days following Hugo. On 24 September, 47,500 businesses and homes in Puerto Rico were without power; the San Juan Star reported that a quarter of electricity customers in Fajardo remained without electric service on October 9, three weeks after Hugo struck the island. Residents of Puerto Rico's northeastern coast were encouraged to boil water to curtail the spread of food- and waterborne diseases, though power outages prevented most from doing so. Repair costs for Puerto Rico Electric Power Authority poles and wires amounted to $50 million; some repair efforts may have been undermined by the looting of copper wire in Hugo's aftermath. At least six workers were killed while repairing power lines. Equipment from the continental U.S. for the restoration of Puerto Rican water supplies arrived beginning on 22 September, with the capacity to produce over 200,000 U.S. gallons (760,000 liters) of potable water daily. USAF sent power generators, plastic sheeting for repairs, and 200,000 The U.S. Army Corps of Engineers distributed over 2 million U.S. gallons (7.6 million liters) of water using 33 tank trucks, with the costs subsidised by the U.S. government. U.S. Coast Guard C-130s and two cutters were sent to San Juan to render aid and deliver supplies. From its supply centers in the continental U.S., the American Red Cross amassed supplies for victims in Puerto Rico and mounted its largest domestic relief effort in four years.

=== Ecological aftermath ===
The defoliation of mangroves and the introduction of freshwater runoff into brackish waters created anoxic conditions that killed many fish in Guadeloupe's mangrove habitats; fish populations would recover by January 1990. The low species richness of mangrove forests was found to a contributing factor to Hugo's damage upon vegetation. Forests with a greater vertical extent and higher species richness were more protected from the hurricane's effects. Bat populations in Montserrat dropped 20-fold in response to extensive habitat loss and community composition transitioned from one dominated by small frugivores to one dominated by larger frugivores and omnivores. Extensive defoliation was documented in the forests of Dominica, Guadeloupe, Montserrat, and Puerto Rico, where vegetation was stripped bare of their flowers, fruits, and leaves.

A survey of bird populations in Saint Croix observed that Hugo's aftermath may have stressed birds more than the hurricane's immediate meteorological forces. Frugivorous, nectarivorous, and seminivorous bird populations declined most among avian diet groups as a result of vegetation loss. The bridled quail-dove (Geotrygon mystacea) was driven out of its traditional habitats on Saint Croix. Declines in the populations of certain bird species were also noted in Saint John. The destruction of habitats forced the relocation of some avian species such as the pearly-eyed thrasher (Margarops fuscatus) and northern waterthrush (Seiurus noveboracensis). The populations or habitats of three endangered Puerto Rican birds were affected by Hugo: the Puerto Rican amazon (Amazona vittata), the Yellow-shouldered blackbird (Agelaius xanthomus), and the Puerto Rican plain pigeon (Columba inornata wetmorei). El Yunque National Forest lost 15 percent of its trees, valued at $5.2 million. However, the increased exposure to sunlight following the loss of tree canopies led to increased diversity of plant species. In Montserrat, the endemic Montserrat oriole (Icterus oberi) was driven out of the South Soufriere Hills after losing much of its habitat.

== Sources ==
- Berke, Philip; Wenger, Dennis (1991). "Montserrat: Emergency Planning, Response and Recovery Related to Hurricane Hugo" (PDF). Texas A&M University. Archived (PDF) from the original on 7 February 2020.
- Learning from Hurricane Hugo: Implications for Public Policy (PDF) (Report). Washington, D.C.: Federal Emergency Management Agency. June 1992 – via Homeland Security Digital Library.
- Chung, Riley, ed. (1994). Hurricane Hugo, Puerto Rico, the Virgin Islands, and Charleston, South Carolina, September 17-22, 1989. National Research Council. doi:10.17226/1993. ISBN 978-0-309-04475-2 – via The National Academies Press.
- "Hurricane Hugo / September 10–22, 1989" (PDF). Homeland Security Digital Library (National Disaster Survey Report). Silver Spring, Maryland: National Oceanic and Atmospheric Administration. May 1990.
- "Storm Data" (PDF). Storm Data. 31 (9). Asheville, North Carolina: National Centers for Environmental Information. September 1989. ISSN 0039-1972. Archived from the original (PDF) on 21 April 2020.
