= Northern Forested Ghauts =

Important Bird Area on the island of Montserrat

Coordinates: 16°47′00″N 62°12′00″W

Map of Montserrat

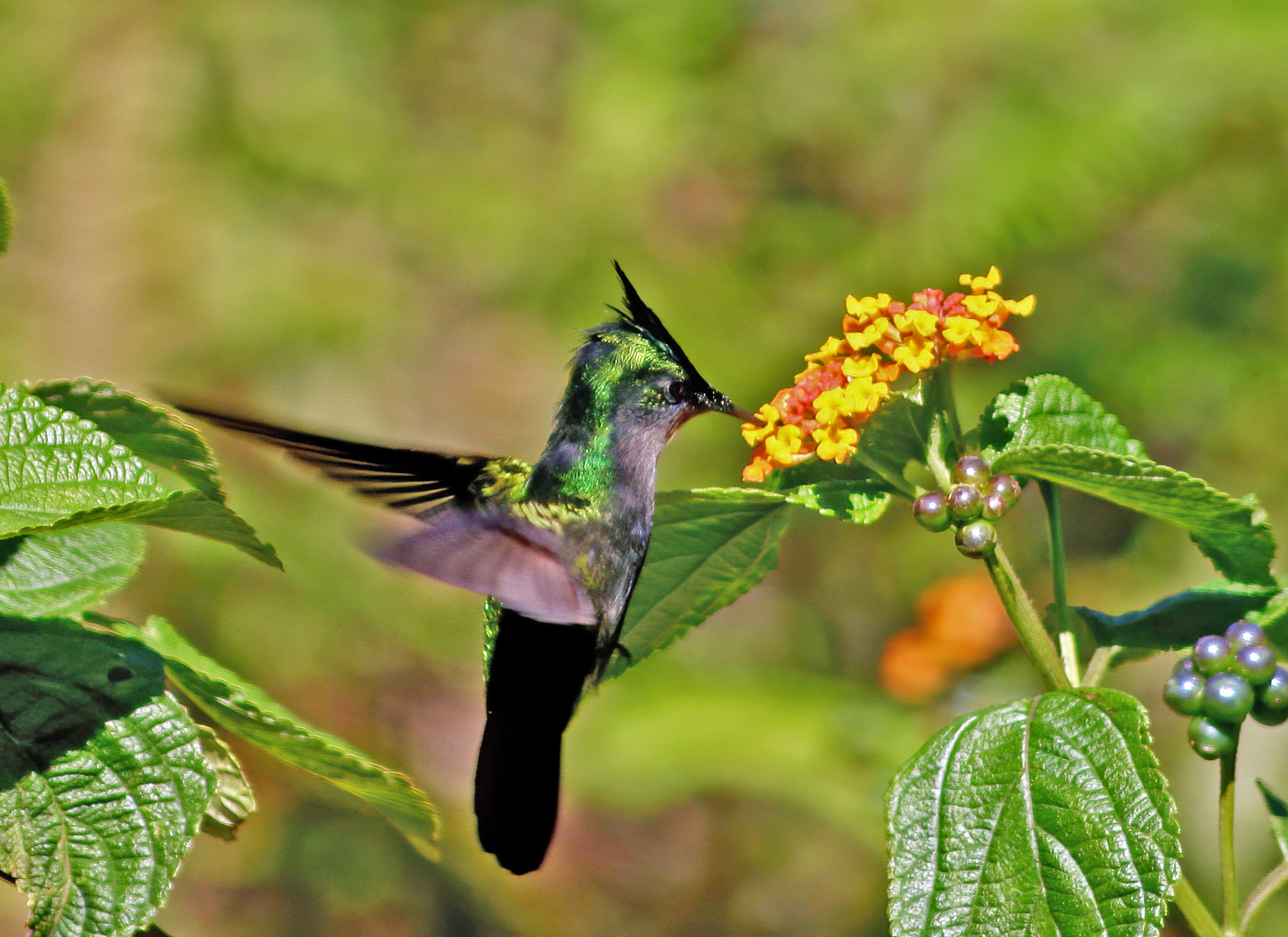
The IBA is an important site for Antillean crested hummingbirds

The Northern Forested Ghauts constitute a tract of land on the island of Montserrat, a British Overseas Territory in the Leeward Islands of the Caribbean Sea. It forms one of the territory's Important Bird Areas (IBAs).

== Description ==
The 498 ha IBA lies in the north of the island. It is disjunct, consisting of several linear sites radiating from the forested Centre Hills block of the island into the northern lowlands. The component sites encompass mainly northward flowing streams (the ravines of which are known locally as ‘ghauts’) that retain fringes and patches of remnant tropical deciduous and semideciduous native forest. Much of the native vegetation is fragmented and surrounded by cultivated and residential land. Other IBAs on the island are the Centre Hills and South Soufriere Hills.

=== Birds ===
The IBA was identified as such by BirdLife International because it supports populations of bridled quail-doves, purple-throated caribs, green-throated caribs, Antillean crested hummingbirds, Caribbean elaenias, scaly-breasted thrashers, pearly-eyed thrashers, brown tremblers, forest thrushes, Lesser Antillean bullfinches and Antillean euphonias.
