= Centre Hills =

Forest reserve on the island of Montserrat

Coordinates: 16°45′00″N 62°12′22″W

Map of Montserrat

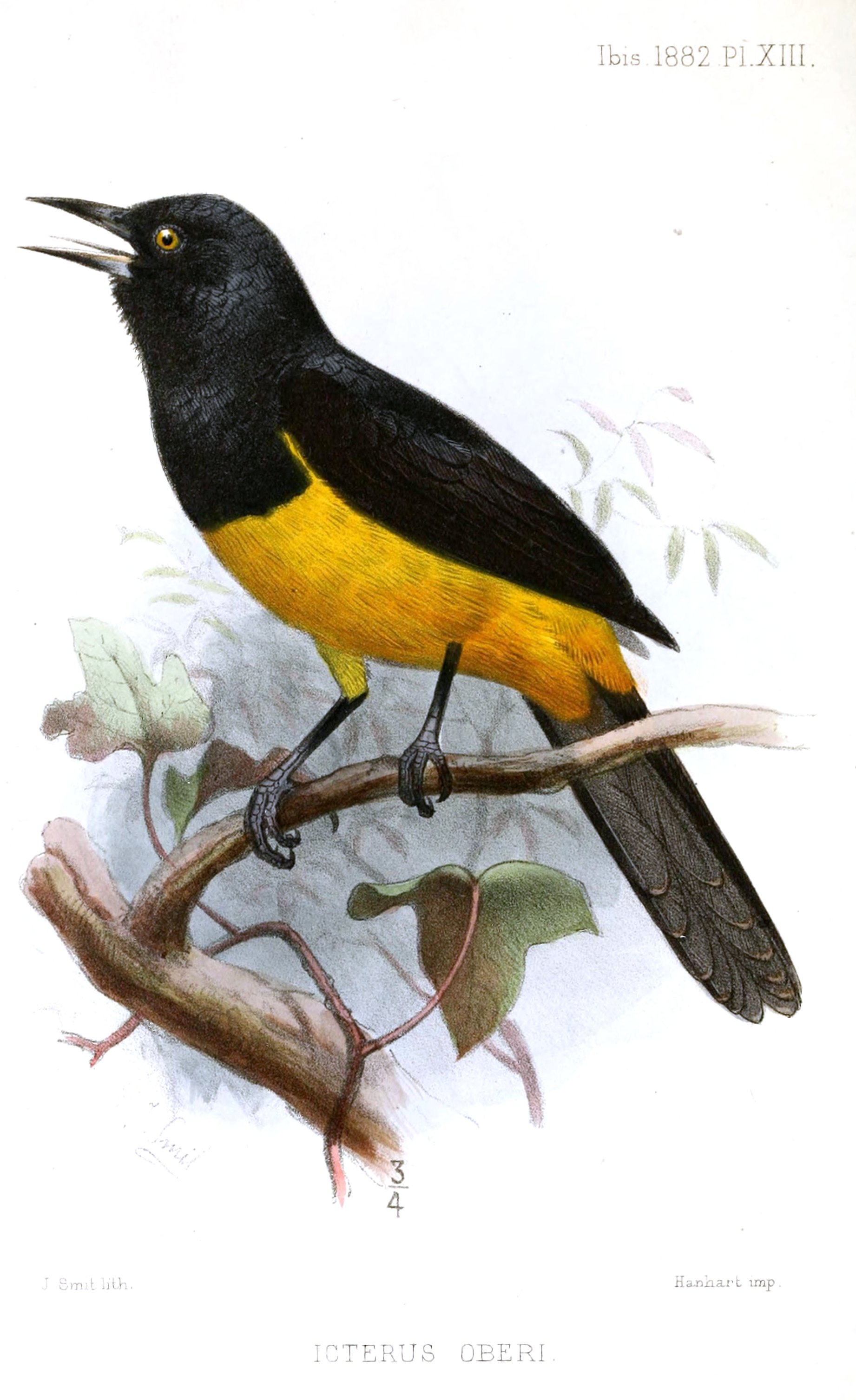
The IBA is an important site for Montserrat orioles.

Centre Hills is a forest reserve on the island of Montserrat, a British Overseas Territory in the Leeward Islands of the Caribbean Sea. It forms one of the territory's Important Bird Areas (IBAs), which encompasses the forest reserve as well as additional habitat for the Montserrat oriole, the territory's endemic, and critically endangered, national bird.

== Description ==
The 1112 ha IBA comprises the largest remnant of Montserrat's native forest. It encompasses the highlands of the northern half of the island from an elevation of 150 m up to the 741 m summit of Katy Hill. The terrain is steep, largely trackless, and riven by the ‘ghauts’, or ravines, that radiate into the islands's northern lowlands. Rainfall increases with altitude, and the vegetation changes from tropical dry forest at the lower elevations, through tropical evergreen forest to elfin forest at the summit. Most of the forest is secondary or regrowth, following historic land clearance for plantation agriculture, and at a variety of successional stages because of damage from frequent hurricanes.

Other IBAs on the island are the Northern Forested Ghauts and South Soufriere Hills. The Centre Hills are one of the two extinct volcanoes (with Silver Hills) that preceded the currently active Soufriere Hills.

=== Birds ===
The IBA was identified as such by BirdLife International because it supports, as well as Montserrat orioles, populations of bridled quail-doves, purple-throated caribs, green-throated caribs, Antillean crested hummingbirds, Caribbean elaenias, scaly-breasted thrashers, pearly-eyed thrashers, brown tremblers, forest thrushes and Lesser Antillean bullfinches.

== See also ==
- Northern Forested Ghauts
