= South Soufriere Hills =

Patch of forest on the island of Montserrat

Coordinates: 16°42′00″N 62°10′00″W

Map of Montserrat

South Soufriere Hills is a 35 ha patch of forest on the island of Montserrat, a British Overseas Territory in the Leeward Islands of the Caribbean Sea. It forms one of the territory's Important Bird Areas (IBAs).

== Description ==
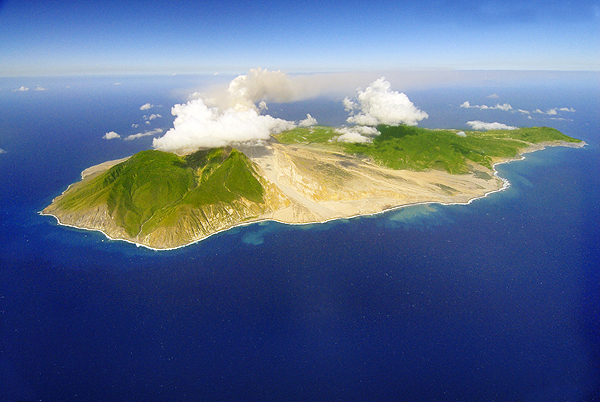
Aerial view of Montserrat from the south-east, showing (right) the Centre Hills and the inhabited northern end of the island, and (left) the Soufrière Hills, with the ash plume being emitted from the volcano

The IBA comprises the largest remnant of Montserrat's native forest in the Soufrière Hills, in the exclusion zone. It has survived the volcanic eruptions and pyroclastic flows that have devastated and depopulated the southern half of the island since the late 1990s. It lies only about 1.5 km south of 915 m Chances Peak, the highest point of the island and the Soufrière Hills stratovolcano. It ranges in elevation from 200 to 750 m above sea level and contains tropical evergreen forest. Other IBAs on the island are the Northern Forested Ghauts and Centre Hills.

=== Birds ===
The IBA was identified as such by BirdLife International because it supports, populations of bridled quail-doves, green-throated caribs, Antillean crested hummingbirds, scaly-breasted thrashers, pearly-eyed thrashers, brown tremblers, forest thrushes, Montserrat orioles and Lesser Antillean bullfinches.
