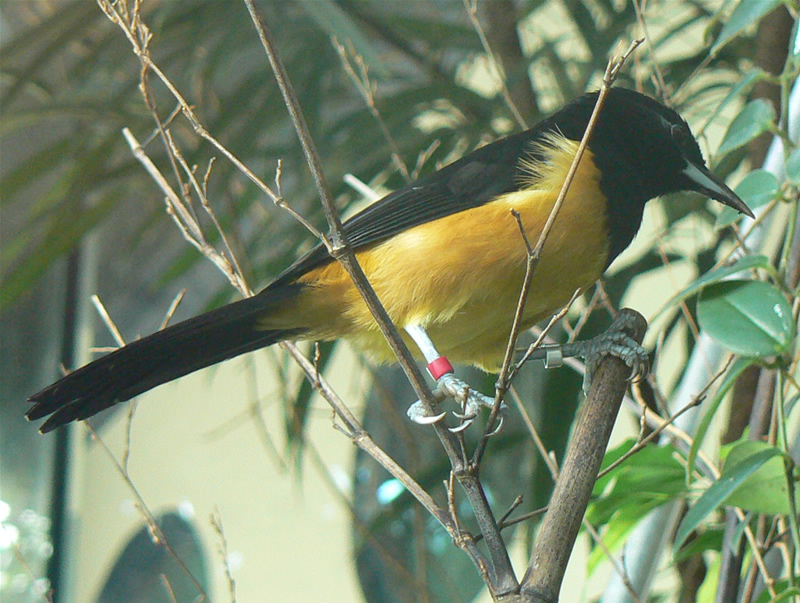
- Male at London Zoo

Conservation status
- Vulnerable (IUCN 3.1)

Scientific classification
- Kingdom: Animalia
- Phylum: Chordata
- Class: Aves
- Order: Passeriformes
- Family: Icteridae
- Genus: Icterus
- Species: I. oberi

Binomial name
- Icterus oberi Lawrence, 1880

= Montserrat oriole =

Species of bird

The Montserrat oriole (Icterus oberi) is a Vulnerable species of bird in the family Icteridae, the oropendolas, New World orioles, and New World blackbirds. It is endemic to the island of Montserrat, a British Overseas Territory in the Lesser Antilles of the Caribbean. It is the national bird of the island.

== Taxonomy and systematics ==
The Montserrat oriole was formally described in 1880 by the American amateur ornithologist George Newbold Lawrence from a specimen collected on Montserrat during an expedition to the West Indies led by the U. S. naturalist Frederick Albion Ober. Lawrence introduced the current binomial Icterus oberi, with the specific epithet chosen to honor Ober. The genus Icterus was introduced by the French zoologist Mathurin Jacques Brisson in 1760.

The Montserrat oriole is monotypic: no subspecies are recognized.

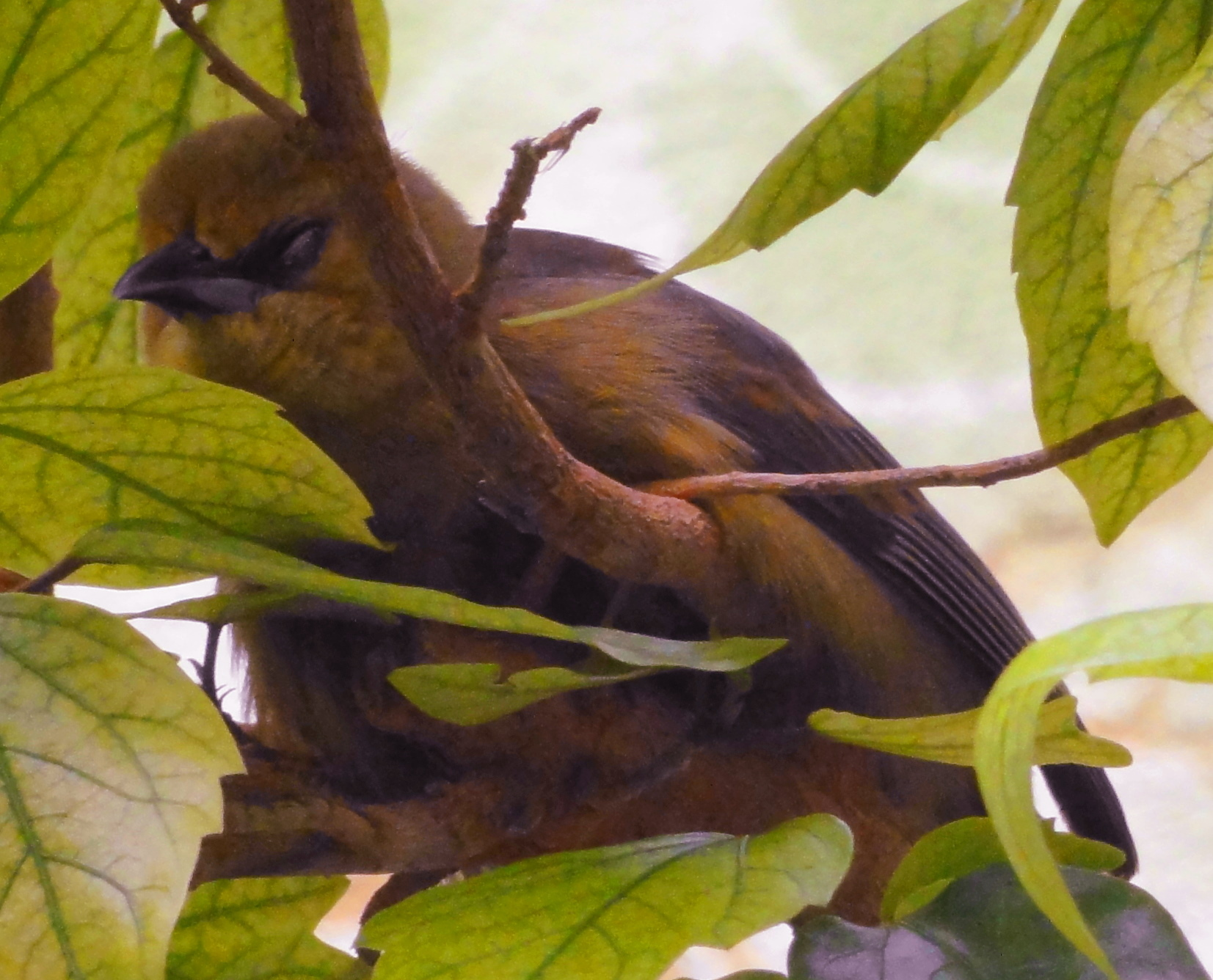
Female at Frankfurt Zoo, Germany

== Description ==
The Montserrat oriole is 20 to 22 cm (7.9 to 8.7 in) long. Males weigh 36 to 39 g (1.3 to 1.4 oz) and females 31.5 to 35.4 g (1.1 to 1.2 oz). Adult males have a black head, throat, upper breast, mantle, back, wings, and tail. Their belly, flanks, and rump are rich yellowish orange. Adult females have a greenish yellow head and greenish olive upperparts and tail. Their wings are greenish brown with yellow leading edges on the flight feathers. Their throat, breast, flanks, and belly are greenish yellow. Both sexes have a black iris, a silvery black bill, and blackish gray legs and feet. Juveniles resemble adult females but are overall duller.

== Distribution and habitat ==
The Montserrat oriole is found only in the Centre Hills and South Soufriere Hills on Montserrat. It apparently previously inhabited a wider range but forest clearance for agriculture in the nineteenth and early twentieth centuries reduced its available habitat. Hurricane Hugo in 1989 felled many trees across the island. The eruptions of the Soufrière Hills volcano beginning in 1995 destroyed half or more of its habitat in those hills. Volcanic ash further damaged forest outside the lava flows. The species inhabits mesic to wet montane evergreen forest. Most of the island's forest is secondary; while the Montserrat oriole is found in both mature and early successional forest it seems to prefer the latter. Most of the species' remaining habitat is at elevations between about 250 and 900 m (800 and 3,000 ft). However, it is found as low as 100 m (300 ft).

== Behavior ==
=== Movement ===
The Montserrat oriole is a year-round resident though some seasonal elevational movements have been noted.

=== Feeding ===
The Montserrat oriole's diet has not been studied in detail. It is known to include insects, spiders, and snails, some fruit, and possibly flowers and nectar. It forages mostly in pairs, from the forest's understory to its subcanopy. It gleans prey from foliage and from within flowers, and also pries off bark to find it.

=== Breeding ===
The Montserrat oriole breeds between late March and September, the peak of the rainy season. Multiple broods in a season are common. Its nest is a basket that the female weaves from plant fibers on the underside of a large leaf or leaf cluster. Nests have been found between 1.5 and 20 m (5 and 65 ft) above the ground. The usual clutch is two to three eggs though a few clutches of four are known. The incubation period is about 14 days and fledging occurs about 13 days after hatch. The female incubates the clutch and both parents provision nestlings. Both introduced rats and the native pearly-eyed thrasher (Margarops fuscatus) are nest predators.

=== Vocalization ===
The Montserrat oriole's song is "a loud series of melodious whistles, but slow and methodical". The song elements are typically "short, sharp whistles or lower pitched gurgled whistles" and often include "a sharply descending whistled tseew". Its call is "a harsh and sharp chic or chuck note" that is repeated many times as an alarm.

== Status ==
The IUCN originally in 1988 assessed the Montserrat oriole as Threatened, then in 1994 as Near Threatened, in 2000 as Critically Endangered, and since 2016 as Vulnerable. Its two remaining populations inhabit a total area of only about 48 km^{2} (19 sq mi). Its estimated population of 460 mature individuals is believed to be stable. Predation by rats and pearly-eyed thrashers and habitat destruction by feral hogs are ongoing threats. Forest clearance for human infrastructure and agriculture is a relatively minor threat. The largest potential threat is volcanic activity, both by direct destruction of forest and by damage and possible health effects from ash.
