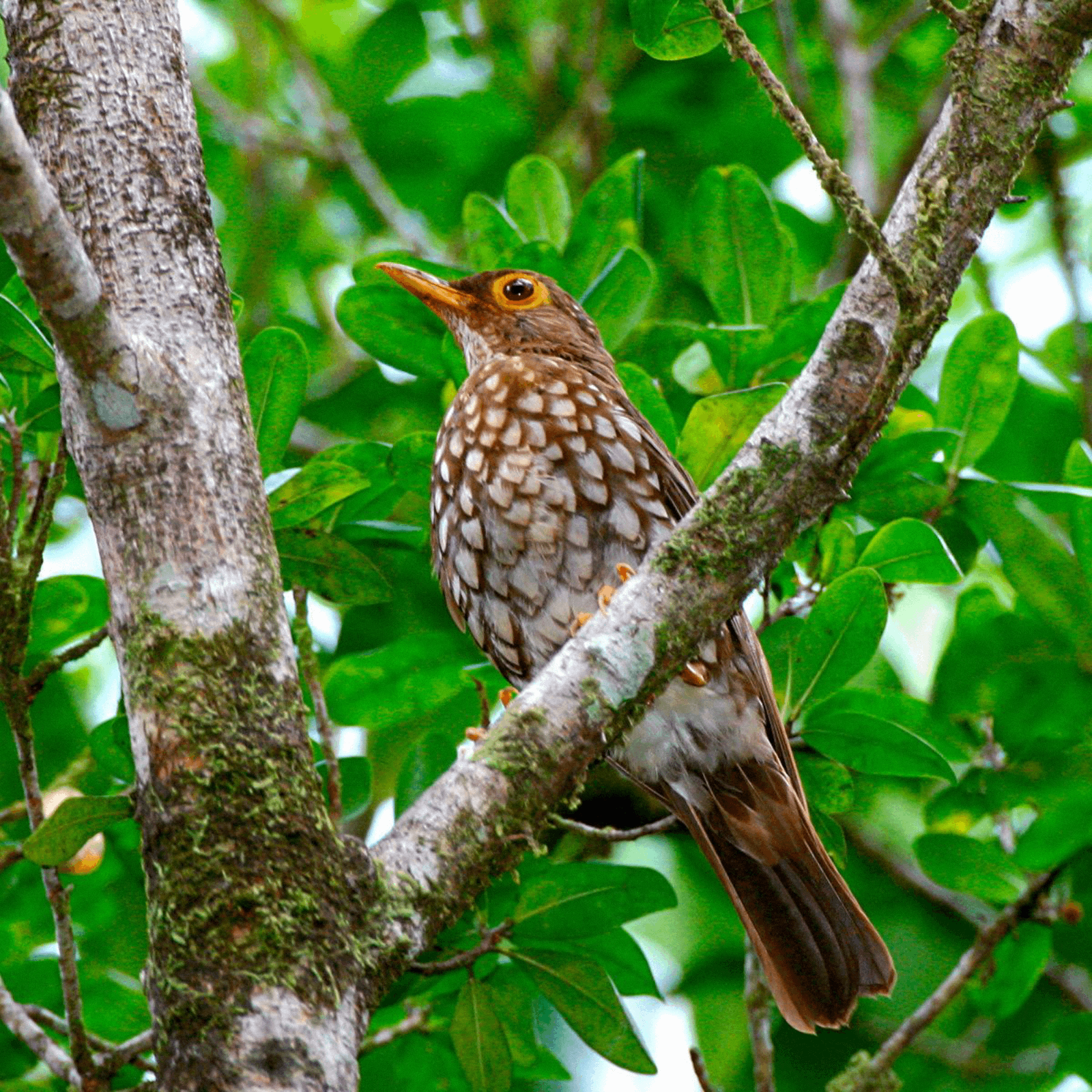

Conservation status
- Near Threatened (IUCN 3.1)

Scientific classification
- Kingdom: Animalia
- Phylum: Chordata
- Class: Aves
- Order: Passeriformes
- Family: Turdidae
- Genus: Turdus
- Species: T. lherminieri

Binomial name
- Turdus lherminieri Lafresnaye, 1844

Synonyms
- Cichlherminia lherminieri

= Forest thrush =

Species of bird

The forest thrush (Turdus lherminieri) is a Near Threatened species of bird in the family Turdidae, the thrushes and allies. It is found on four islands in the Lesser Antilles.

== Taxonomy and systematics ==
The forest thrush was originally described by Frédéric de Lafresnaye in 1844 as Turdus L'Iherminieri. For a time it was placed in its own genus Cichlherminia. Following genetic studies published in the early 2000s that genus was merged into Turdus, restoring the species' original binomial (with modern spelling).

The forest thrush has these four subspecies:

- T. l. lherminieri Lafresnaye, 1844
- T. l. dominicensis (Lawrence, 1880)
- T. l. dorotheae (Wolters, 1980)
- T. l. sanctaeluciae (Scalter, PL, 1880)

== Description ==
The forest thrush is 25 to 30 cm (9.8 to 12 in) long and weighs about 100 g (3.5 oz). The sexes have the same plumage. Adults of the nominate subspecies T. l. lherminieri have a mostly warm brown head with thin white lines on the cheeks and ear coverts and a wide yellow eye-ring. Their upperparts, wings, and tail are also warm brown. Their underparts are whitish with buff-edged dark brown scallops. They have a yellow iris, bill, and legs and feet. Juveniles are slightly paler than adults with faint pale streaks on their upperparts and mottling rather than well-defined scallops on their underparts. Subspecies T. l. dominicensis is smaller than the nominate and has darker upperparts, a darker breast with smaller scallops, a white belly, and paler legs. T. l. dorotheae has rufous edges on the throat feathers and more white on the center of the breast feathers than the nominate. T. l. sanctaeluciae is smaller than the nominate with paler upperparts and larger, buffish, scallops on the breast.

== Distribution and habitat ==
Each subspecies of the forest thrush inhabits a different island in the Lesser Antilles. They are found thus:

- T. l. lherminieri: Guadeloupe
- T. l. dominicensis: Dominica
- T. l. dorotheae: Montserrat
- T. l. sanctaeluciae: St. Lucia

The forest thrush inhabits tropical evergreen forest both primary and secondary. In elevation it ranges from sea level to about 1,000 m (3,300 ft) though it is mostly found at mid- to upper elevations. On Monserrat it favors mature mesic forests with a dense canopy.

== Behavior ==
=== Movement ===
The forest thrush is a year-round resident on each island but wanders widely to find food.

=== Feeding ===
The forest thrush feeds on insects and berries. It forages at all levels of the forest.

=== Breeding ===
The forest thrush breeds between April and July or March to August. It makes a bulky cup nest of moss and usually places it near the ground. The clutch is two or three greenish blue eggs. The incubation period is about 14 days and fledging occurs 16 to 17 days after hatch. Details of parental care are not known.

=== Vocalization ===
The forest thrush usually sings from a hidden perch. Its song is "[s]oft, musical, clear notes". Its calls include a "sharp chuk or chuk-chuk".

== Status ==
The IUCN originally in 1988 assessed the forest thrush as being of Least Concern, in 1994 as Near Threatened, in 2000 as Vulnerable, and since 2019 again as Near Threatened. Its estimated population of at least 100,000 mature individuals is believed to be decreasing. Though deforestation and volcanic eruptions on Monserrat significantly reduced its population there it has rebounded to about 50% of its former abundance. The species is thought to be declining slowly on Guadeloupe but populations on Dominica and St. Lucia "are potentially in rapid decline". Minor threats include hunting, logging, and invasive species. Volcanic eruptions are considered a significant threat. Climate change-induced storms and flooding are a threat of unknown magnitude. Subspecies T. l. sanctaeluciae is considered rare on St. Lucia; there is only one record in the twenty-first century. The other three subspecies are considered uncommon.
