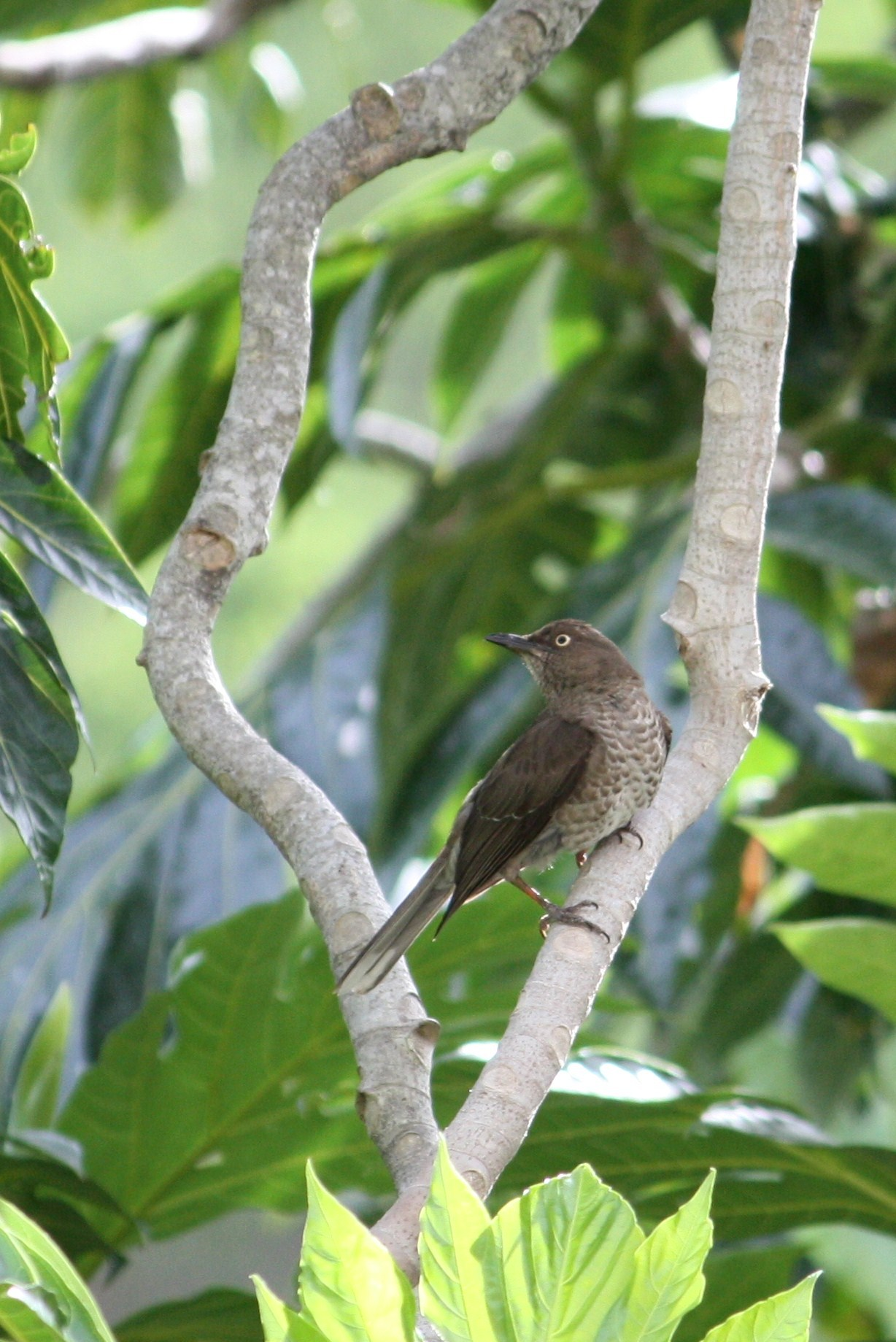
- in Coulibistrie, Dominica.

Conservation status
- Least Concern (IUCN 3.1)

Scientific classification
- Kingdom: Animalia
- Phylum: Chordata
- Class: Aves
- Order: Passeriformes
- Family: Mimidae
- Genus: Allenia; Cory, 1891
- Species: A. fusca

Binomial name
- Allenia fusca (Müller, 1776)

Synonyms
- Margarops fuscus

= Scaly-breasted thrasher =

Species of bird

The scaly-breasted thrasher (Allenia fusca) is a species of bird in the family Mimidae. It is found throughout much of the Lesser Antilles of the Caribbean Sea.

== Taxonomy and systematics ==
The scaly-breasted thrasher was originally placed in genus Margarops with the pearly-eyed thrasher (M. fuscatus) but is now in the monotypic genus Allenia. It has five subspecies:

- A. f. hypenema Buden (1993)
- A. f. vincenti Kratter & Garrido (1996)
- A. f. atlantica Buden (1993)
- A. f. schwartzi Buden (1993)
- A. f. fusca Müller (1776)

== Description ==
The scaly-breasted thrasher is approximately 23 cm (9.1 in) long and weighs 53 to 98 g (1.9 to 3.5 oz) with an average weight of 67 g (2.4 oz). With its rather short and slightly decurved bill, this thrasher resembles a thrush. Adults of the nominate subspecies have a dark gray-brown head and upperparts with a reddish tinge on the rump. Their tail is a darker brownish black and its outer feathers have white tips. The folded wing shows a single white bar. Their chin and throat are whitish with brown streaks. The underparts are whitish and the chest and flanks have bold gray-brown markings that give the eponymous scaly appearance.

The other subspecies differ mostly in size and the intensity of their upperparts' color. A. f. hypenema is the largest and is paler than the nominate. A. f. schwartzi is mid-sized and has more white on its tail. A. f. vincenti is the smallest and is darker overall than the nominate. A. f. atlantica compared to the nominate is more reddish brown above and has less white in the tail.

== Distribution and habitat ==
The subspecies of scaly-breasted thrasher are found thus:

- A. f. hypenema, northern Lesser Antilles from Saint Martin south through Saba, Saint Barthélemy, Antigua, Saint Kitts and Nevis, and Montserrat to Guadeloupe; possibly extinct on Sint Eustatius and Barbuda
- A. f. vincenti, Saint Vincent, and vagrant to the Grenadines
- A. f. atlantica, Barbados (but is probably extinct)
- A. f. schwartzi, Saint Lucia
- A. f. fusca, Dominica, Grenada, and Martinique

The scaly-breasted thrasher primarily inhabits forest and semi-open woodland and is also found around human settlements.

== Behavior ==
=== Feeding ===
The scaly-breasted thrasher forages in trees; on different islands it hunts at different levels from low down to high in the canopy. It is omnivorous; its diet includes arthropods, fruits, and berries. It appears to eat a larger percentage of vegetable foods than other thrashers.

=== Breeding ===
The scaly-breasted thrasher breeds in May and June. It builds a cup nest in a bush or tree. The clutch size is two or three.

=== Vocalization ===
The scaly-breasted thrasher's song is a "[s]eries of varied notes and phrases" similar to that of Mimus mockingbirds but softer and slower.

== Status ==
The IUCN has assessed the scaly-breasted thrasher as being of Least Concern. It is fairly common to common through most of its range though rare on Grenada.
