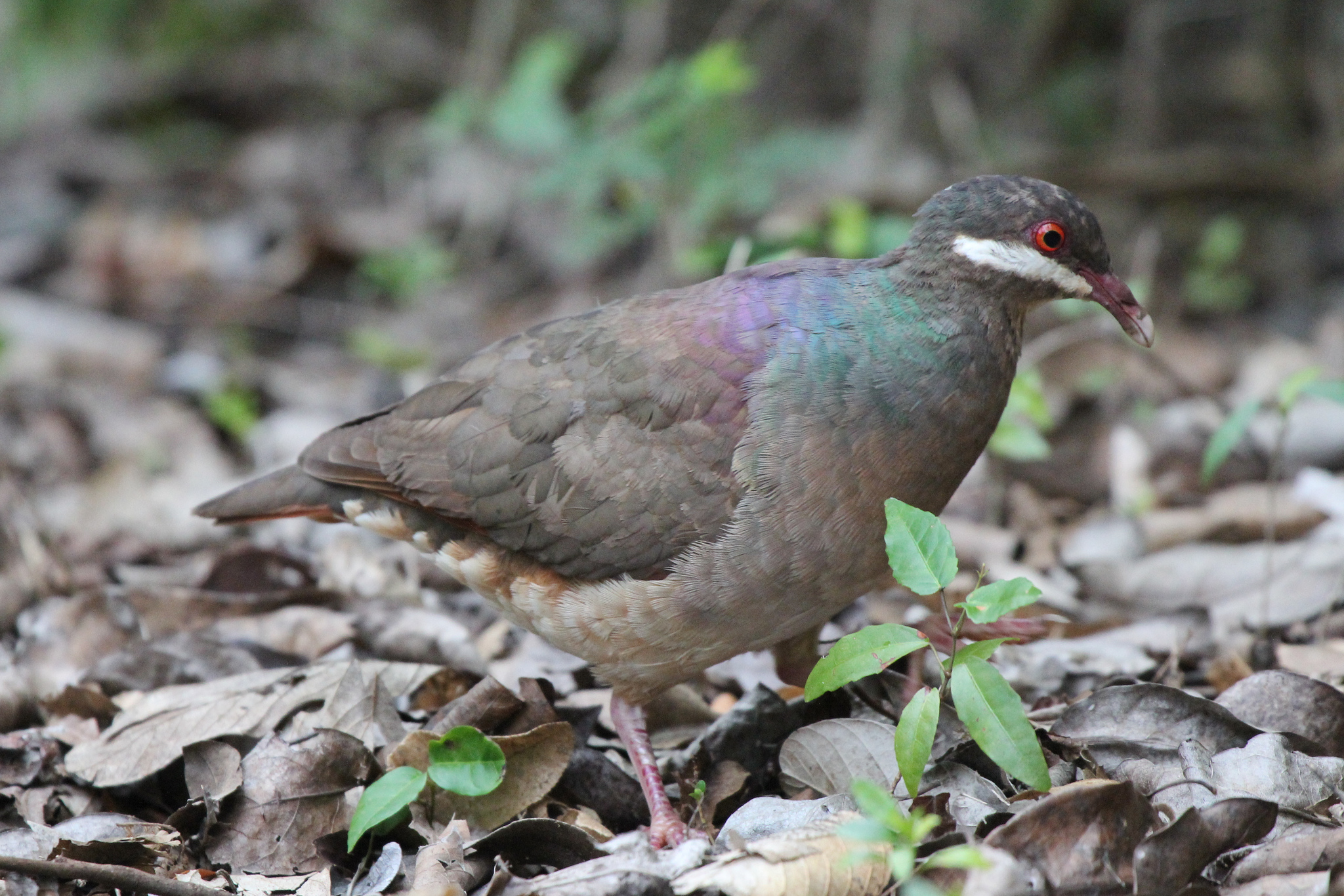

Conservation status
- Least Concern (IUCN 3.1)

Scientific classification
- Kingdom: Animalia
- Phylum: Chordata
- Class: Aves
- Order: Columbiformes
- Family: Columbidae
- Genus: Geotrygon
- Species: G. mystacea

Binomial name
- Geotrygon mystacea (Temminck, 1811)

= Bridled quail-dove =

Species of bird

The bridled quail-dove (Geotrygon mystacea) is a species of bird in the family Columbidae. It is found from Saint Lucia in the Lesser Antilles north and west to Puerto Rico.

== Taxonomy and systematics ==
The bridled quail-dove is monotypic. It has been suggested that it and the Key West quail-dove (Geotrygon chrysia) form a superspecies.

== Description ==
Specimens of bridled quail-dove from several islands had mean weights between 208 and 224 g (7.3 and 7.9 oz) with fairly large standard deviations. These data and measurements of various body parts suggest that the species "has low morphometric variance across its distribution."

Adult bridled quail-doves are mostly brown. They have a bold white stripe across the face below the eye and a small white patch on the throat. The male's head and nape are iridescent green which becomes blues and violets on the lower neck and upper back; females have less iridescence. The tail is dark brownish gray and the belly cream. The folded wing shows some cinnamon markings.

== Distribution and habitat ==
The bridled quail-dove is or was found from Puerto Rico south and east through the Lesser Antilles to Saint Lucia. As of 2009, it was generally uncommon to rare throughout its range, and might have been extirpated from some islands. Privately owned Guana Island, one of the British Virgin Islands, appears to be the only site where is considered common. It inhabits forested mountain areas that have dense understory and much leaf litter.

== Behavior ==
=== Feeding ===
Bridled quail-doves usually forage singly or in pairs and also sometimes in larger groups. They probe and toss leaf litter on the forest floor searching for seeds, fallen fruits, and invertebrates such as snails and insects. These birds have also been documented to eat Sphaerodactylus macrolepis, a lizard native to the Puerto Rico area.

=== Breeding ===
The bridled quail-dove builds a platform nest of twigs in vines, shrubs, or trees. The clutch size is one or two.

=== Vocalization ===
The bridled quail-dove's call is "a relatively deep, resonating coo" described as "haoooo", "hoo-hoooooo", or "who-whooo". It also makes a "guttural croaking" call whose purpose is not known.

== Status ==
The IUCN has assessed the bridled quail-dove as being of Least Concern. However, there are few historical data with which to compare modern records so it is not clear whether the population is in decline or stable. Habitat loss, hunting, natural disasters such as hurricanes and volcanic eruptions, and predation by introduced mammals are all known to have influenced the populations on one or more islands. In Puerto Rico, it is "the highest territorial priority species in need of conservation measures."
