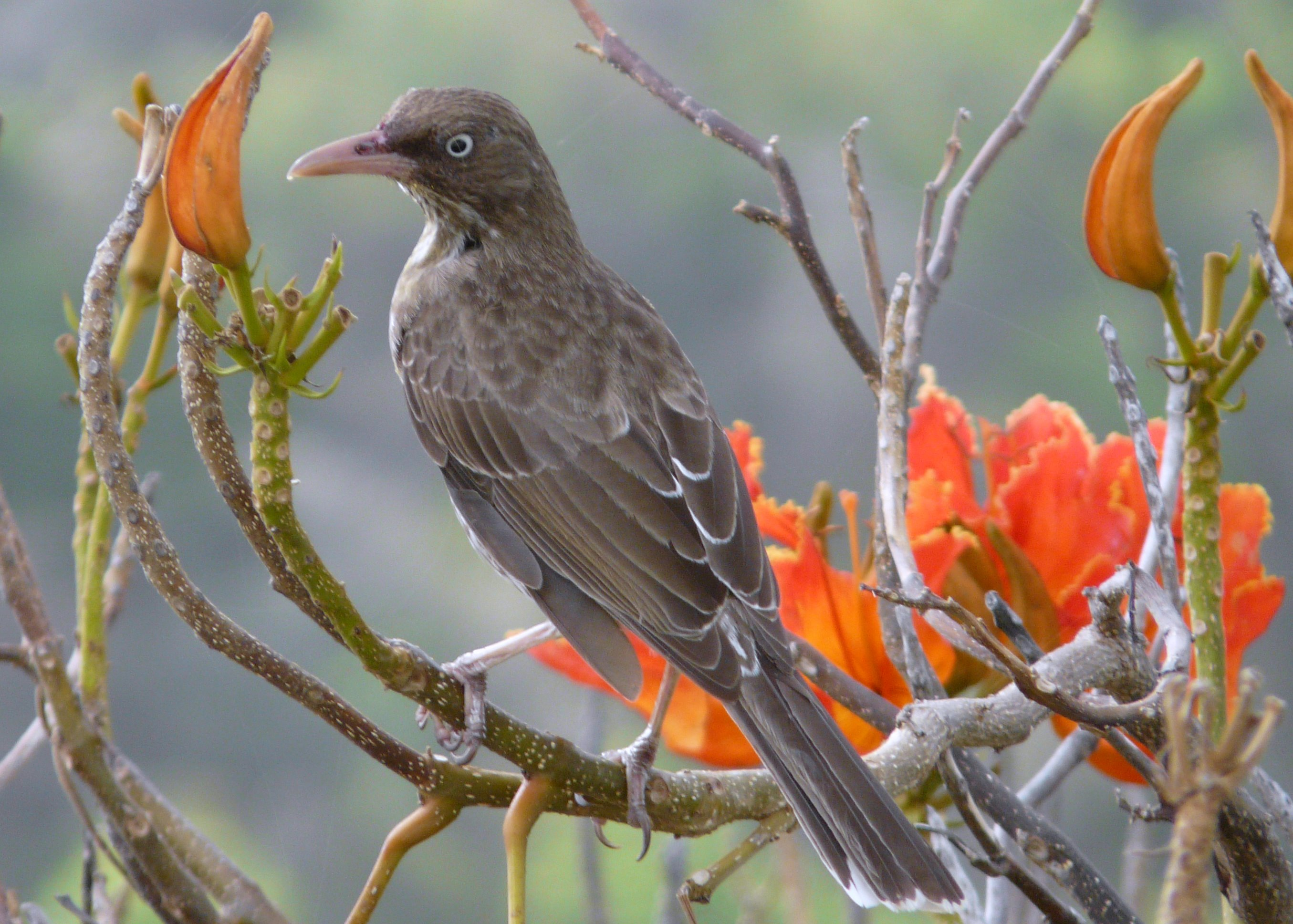
- On Guana Island, British Virgin Islands

Conservation status
- Least Concern (IUCN 3.1)

Scientific classification
- Kingdom: Animalia
- Phylum: Chordata
- Class: Aves
- Order: Passeriformes
- Family: Mimidae
- Genus: Margarops; P.L. Sclater, 1859
- Species: M. fuscatus

Binomial name
- Margarops fuscatus (Vieillot, 1808)

Subspecies
- M. f. fuscatus (Vieillot, 1808); M. f. densirostris (Vieillot, 1808); M. f. klinikowskii Garrido & Remsen, 1996; M. f. bonairensis Phelps Sr. & Phelps Jr., 1948

= Pearly-eyed thrasher =

Species of bird

The pearly-eyed thrasher (Margarops fuscatus) is a bird in the thrasher family Mimidae. It is found on many Caribbean islands, from the Bahamas in the north to the Grenadines in the south, with an isolated subspecies on Bonaire.

== Description ==
The pearly-eyed thrasher is the largest species in the Mimidae, growing to 28 to 30 cm (11 to 11.8 inches) in length.

== Taxonomy ==
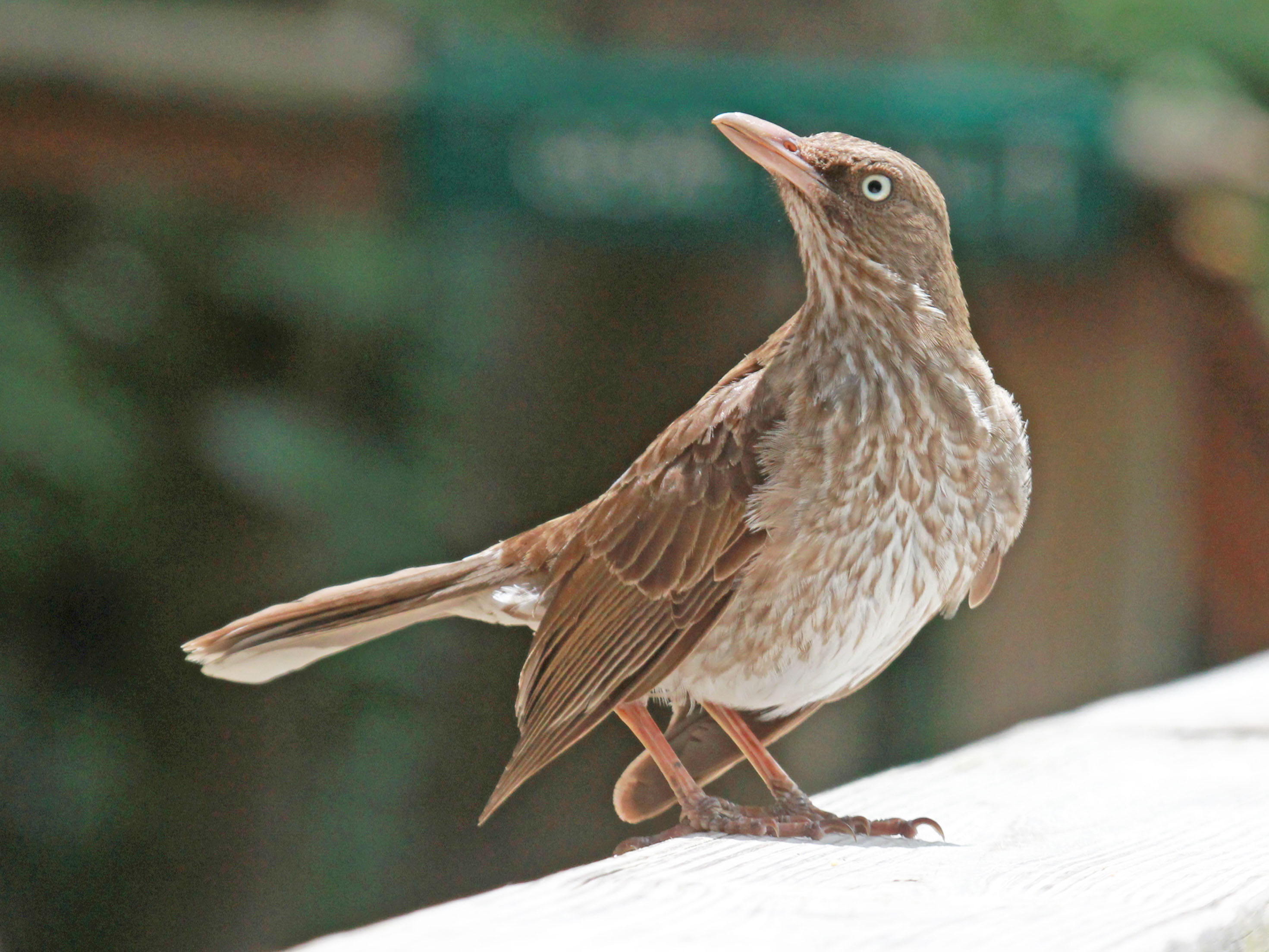
On St John Island, Virgin Islands

Its genus, Margarops, is currently considered monotypic; formerly the scaly-breasted thrasher was placed in the same genus. However, M. fusctaus is now known to be closer to the Cinclocerthia tremblers.

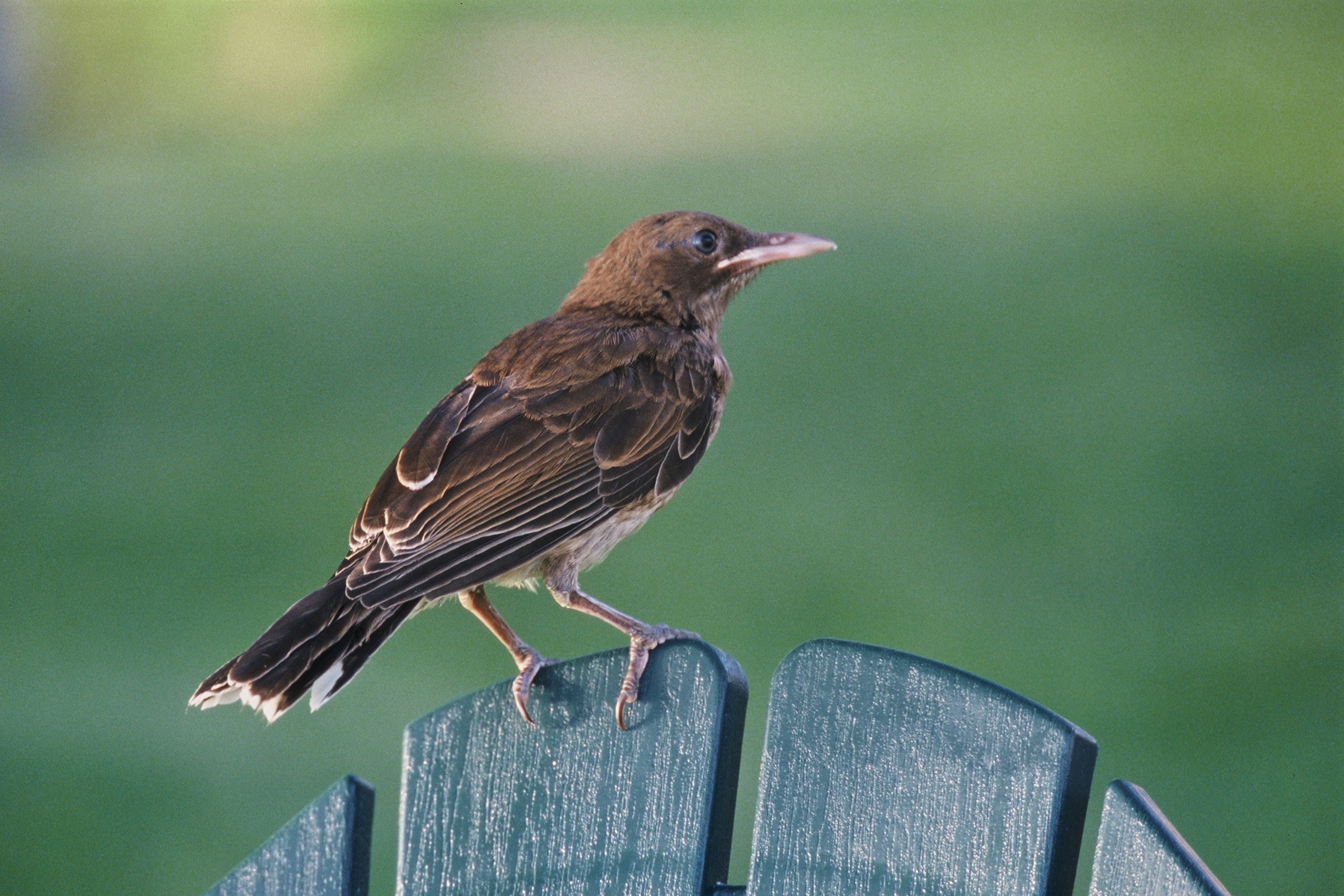
Immature northern pearly-eyed thrasher (M. f. fuscatus)

While this is not a migratory bird, considerable gene flow between populations appears to have taken place at least until fairly recently in its evolutionary history. There are four subspecies, two of which can be distinguished genetically: M. f. fuscatus (the nominate subspecies, which is found between the Greater Antilles and Antigua and Barbuda), and M. f. densirostris (occurring from Montserrat and Guadeloupe southwards). When exactly the pearly-eyed thrasher lineage diverged from its relatives cannot be said with reasonable certainty, as no fossils are known and the standard molecular clock model cannot be applied to the Mimidae, as mutation rates seem to have varied over time.

== Distribution and habitat ==
The pearly-eyed thrasher has a somewhat disjunct distribution throughout the West Indies: it is found in the Bahamas, Puerto Rico, the Virgin Islands, the Turks and Caicos Islands, the eastern Dominican Republic (as well as Isla Beata), many of the Lesser Antilles (except Barbados and Grenada, where it is extirpated), Saba, Sint Eustatius, and Bonaire. Its main habitat is bushes and trees in mountain forests and coffee plantations.

In Puerto Rico, as well as occupying the main island, it is also found on Mona Island. In the Bahamas, it is a breeding species on San Salvador, Exuma, and Long Island, and probably also on Acklins, Mayaguana, and Great Inagua; in addition it is found as a wintering species on Eleuthra and Cat Island. In the Lesser Antilles, it is a breeding species in the SSS islands (the northern part of the Netherlands Antilles), Barbuda, Antigua, Montserrat, Guadeloupe, Dominica, Martinique, St. Lucia, Saint Thomas, and Saint Vincent and the Grenadines. The subspecies M. f. bonairensis was formerly found on La Horquilla, one of the Hermanos Islands off the north coast of Venezuela, but it is now believed to be extirpated from there, having last been reported in 1908.

== Ecology ==
Song of pearly-eyed thrasher
Recorded on St. John, USVI

The pearly-eyed thrasher is described as an aggressive, opportunistic omnivore that feeds primarily on large insects, but also feeds on fruits and berries, and will occasionally eat lizards, frogs, small crabs and other bird's eggs and nestlings.

This species nests in cavities. In Puerto Rico, it is known to compete with the critically endangered Puerto Rican amazon (Amazona vittata) for nesting sites, and may even destroy the parrot's eggs.

== See also ==
- Fauna of Puerto Rico
- List of endemic fauna of Puerto Rico
- List of Puerto Rican birds
- List of Vieques birds
