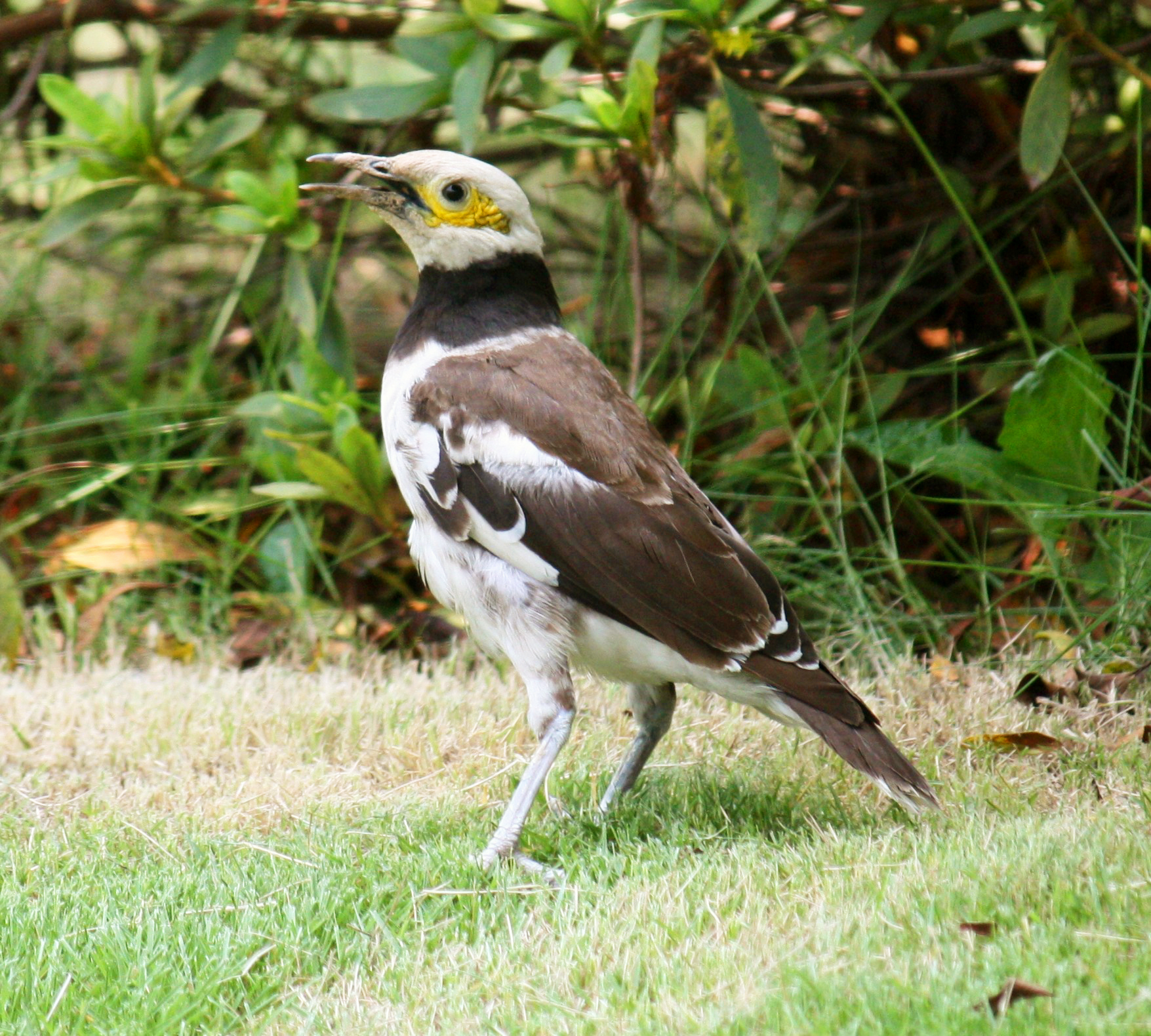
- Black-collared starling (Gracupica nigricollis)

Scientific classification
- Kingdom: Animalia
- Phylum: Chordata
- Class: Aves
- Order: Passeriformes
- Family: Sturnidae
- Genus: Gracupica; Lesson, 1831

Type species
- Gracula melanoleuca = Gracula nigricollis Lesson, 1831

= Gracupica =

Genus of birds

Gracupica is a genus of Asian birds in the family Sturnidae. It is sometimes merged with Sturnus or Sturnia.

== Taxonomy ==
The genus Gracupica was introduced in 1831 by the French naturalist René Lesson to accommodate the black-collared starling which is therefore the type species. The genus name combines the Latin graculus meaning "jackdaw" with pica meaning "magpie".

=== Species ===
The genus contains four species.

Image	Scientific name	Common name	Distribution
	Gracupica nigricollis	Black-collared starling	Brunei, Cambodia, China, Laos, Myanmar, Thailand, and Vietnam
	Gracupica contra	Indian pied myna	Indian subcontinent
	Gracupica floweri	Siamese pied myna	mainland Southeast Asia
	Gracupica jalla	Javan pied myna	southern Sumatra, Java, and Bali

A 2021 study found that G. contra represents a species complex of 3 distinct species formerly thought to be subspecies of G. contra: the Indian pied myna (G. contra sensu stricto) from most of the Indian Subcontinent, Myanmar, and Yunnan in China; the Siamese pied myna (G. floweri) from Thailand and Cambodia, and the possibly extinct in the wild Javan pied myna (G. jalla), historically known from Java and Bali in Indonesia. The International Ornithological Congress has accepted these results.
