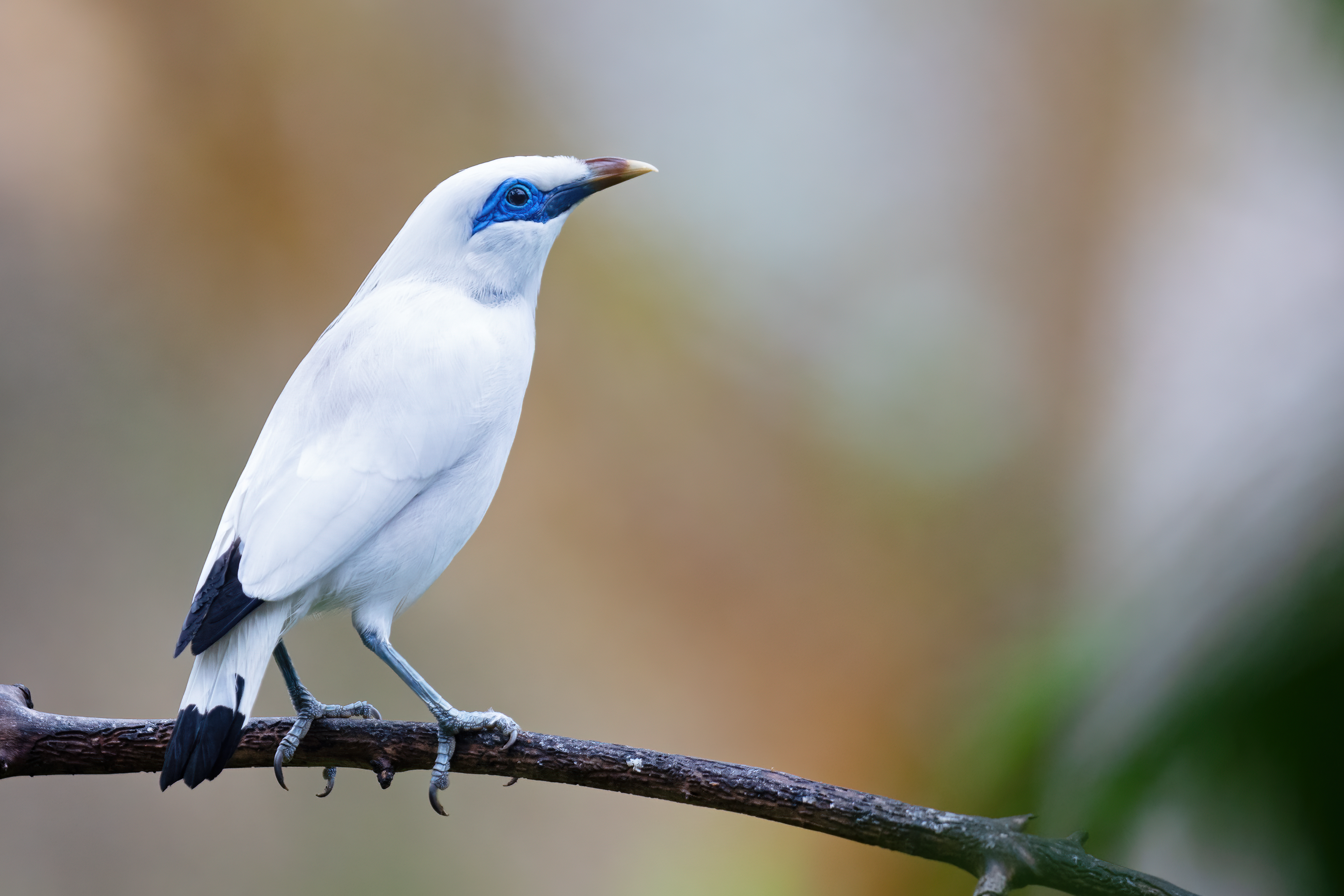
- In West Bali National Park

Conservation status
- Critically Endangered (IUCN 3.1)
- CITES Appendix I

Scientific classification
- Kingdom: Animalia
- Phylum: Chordata
- Class: Aves
- Order: Passeriformes
- Family: Sturnidae
- Genus: Leucopsar; Stresemann, 1912
- Species: L. rothschildi

Binomial name
- Leucopsar rothschildi Stresemann, 1912

= Bali starling =

Species of bird

The Bali starling (Leucopsar rothschildi), also known as Rothschild's mynah, Bali myna, or Bali mynah, locally known as jalak Bali, is a medium-sized (up to 25 cm (9.8 in) long), stocky bird native to northwest Bali in Indonesia. It is almost wholly white with a long, drooping crest, and black tips on the wings and tail. The bird has blue bare skin around the eyes, greyish legs and a brown and yellow bill. Both sexes are similar. It is critically endangered and in 2020, fewer than 50 adults were assumed to exist in the wild.

== Taxonomy and systematics ==
The Bali starling was formally described in 1912 by the German ornithologist Erwin Stresemann based on a female specimen collected on the island of Bali in Indonesia. He introduced a new genus Leucopsar and coined the binomial name Leucopsar rothschildi. The genus name combines the Ancient greek λευκός (leukos) meaning "white" with ψάρ (psar) meaning "starling". The specific epithet was chosen to honour Walter Rothschild who had allowed Stresemann to examine birds at his museum in Tring, Hertfordshire, England. The Bali starling remains the only species placed in the genus Leucopsar. It appears to be most closely related to Sturnia and the brahminy starling which was initially placed in Sturnus then later moved by a study in 2008 to Sturnia, as Sturnus as delimited was highly paraphyletic.

== Description ==
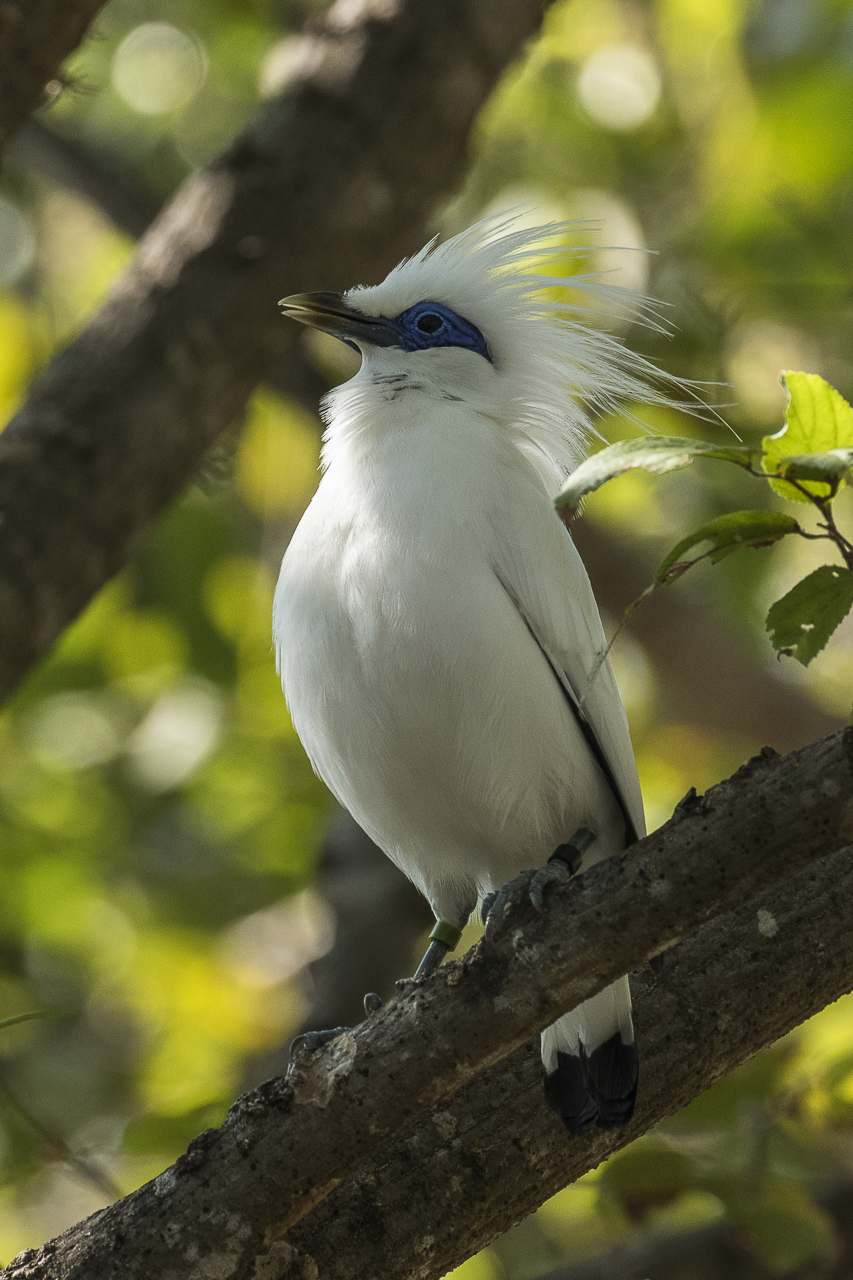
At West Bali National Park, Bali, Indonesia

The Bali starling is a medium-large starling around 25 centimetres (9.8 in) in length. It is almost wholly white with a long, drooping crest, black wing-tips and tail tip. It has a brown and yellow bill with blue bare skin around the eyes and legs. The sexes are similar in appearance but the male has a longer crest than the female. The black-winged myna (Acridotheres melanopterus), a similar species, has a shorter crest and a much larger area of black on wings and tail, plus a yellow eye-ring (without feathers) and legs.

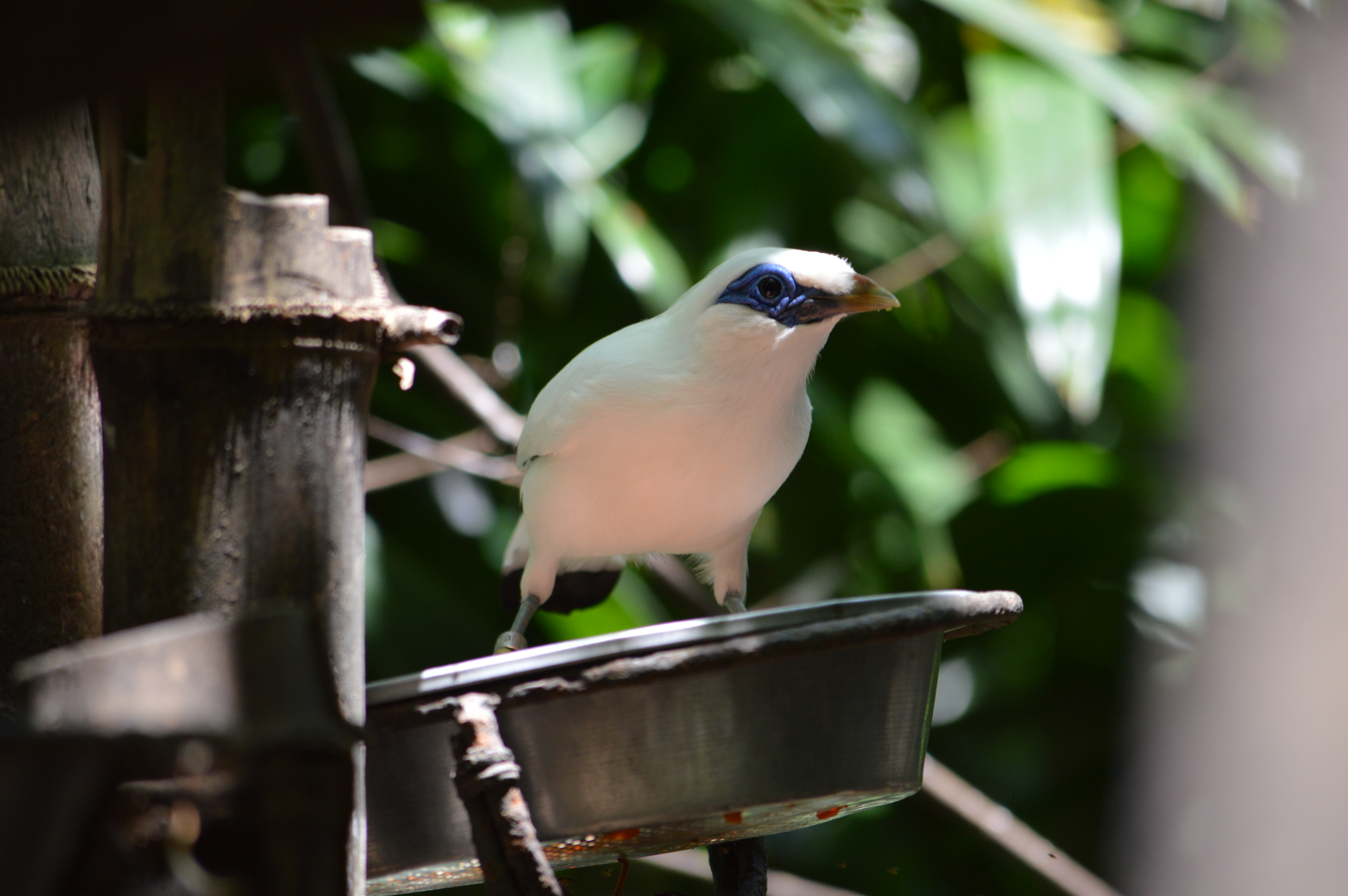
At the Waddesdon Aviary

== Distribution and habitat ==
The Bali starling's range is restricted to northwest Bali (and its offshore islands) in Indonesia, where it is the island's only endemic vertebrate species. In 1991, the bird was designated the faunal emblem of Bali. Featured on the Indonesian 200 rupiah coin, its local name is jalak Bali (Balinese script: ᬚᬮᬓ᭄ᬩᬮᬶ).

== Behaviour and ecology ==
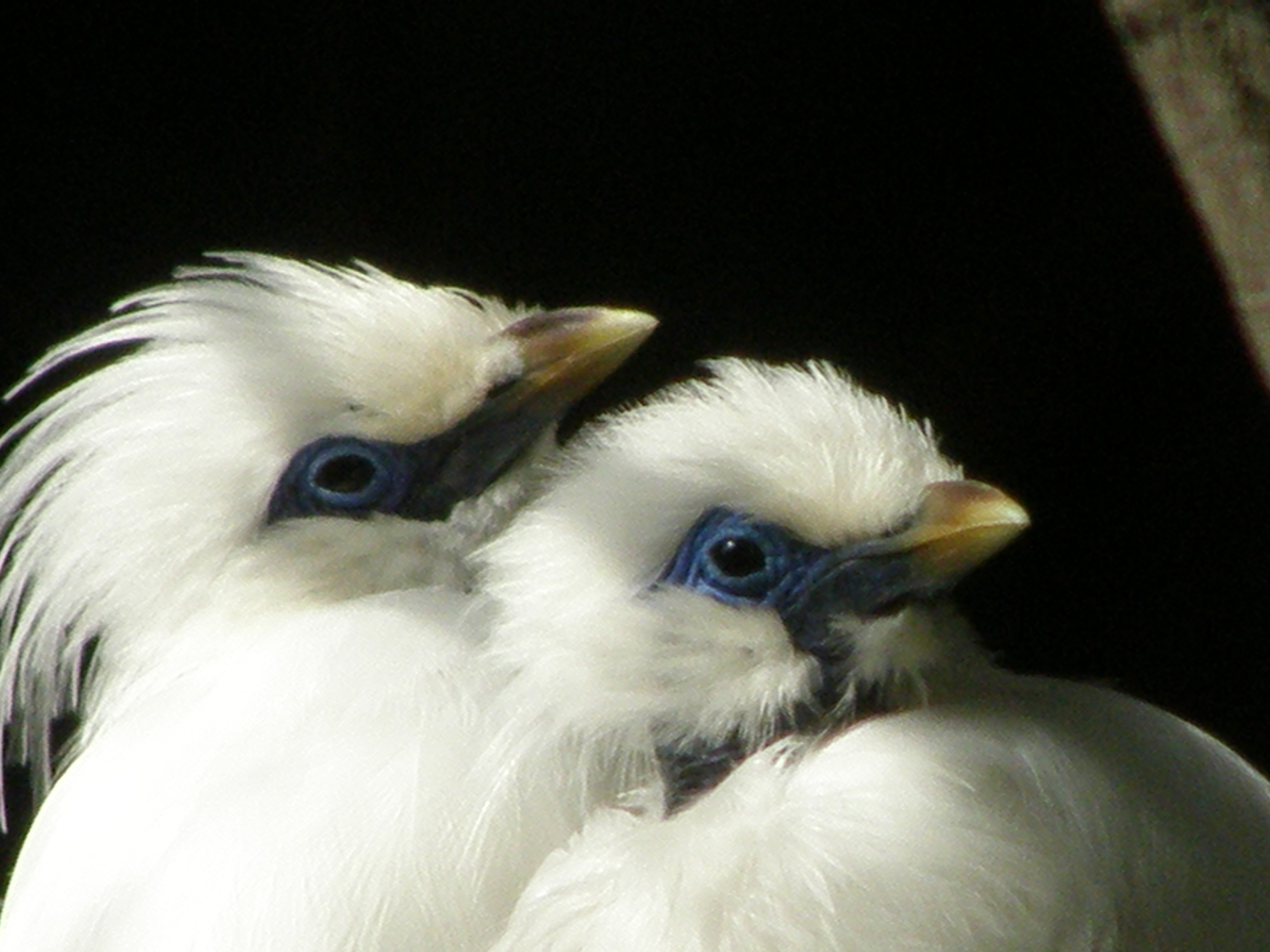
Two juveniles

In its natural habitat it is inconspicuous, using tree tops for cover and–unlike other starlings–usually coming to the ground only to drink or to find nesting materials; this would seem to be an adaptation to its noticeability to predators when out in the open. The Bali starling often gathers in groups when it is young to better locate food and watch out for predators. The vocalizations are a variety of sharp chattering calls and an emphatic tweet.

The Bali starling's diet includes fruit, seeds, worms and insects.

=== Breeding ===
During the breeding season (the rainy season of Bali), males attract female by calling loudly and bobbing up and down. The birds nest in tree cavities, with the female laying and incubating two or three eggs. Both males and females bring food to the nest for chicks after hatching.

== Status and conservation ==
The Bali starling is critically endangered, and the wild population has been close to extinction since at least 1994. As of 2015, less than 100 adults are assumed to exist in the wild, with about 1,000 believed to survive in captivity. The Bali starling is listed in Appendix I of CITES. Trade even in captive-bred specimens is strictly regulated and the species is not generally available legally to private individuals. However, experienced aviculturalists may become affiliated with captive-breeding programs, allowing them to legally keep this species. The number of captive birds bought on the black market is estimated to be twice the number of legally acquired individuals in the captive breeding programs.

In 2018, there were three locations on Bali where the birds existed in the wild: the West Bali National Park; Bali's small island of Nusa Penida and Begawan Foundation's breeding and release site at Melinggih Kelod, Payangan.

=== Bali starling breeding program ===
A "breeding loan" involves 12 breeders who each received 15 male and 15 female starling birds from the Association of Starling Conservationists in Bogor, West Java. As collateral every breeder must put up a cow in case all the birds died. The breeders are obliged to release 10 percent of the brood into West Bali National Park and the rest can be sold off privately. There is one pair of Bali starlings at the National Aviary in Pittsburgh, Pennsylvania that are part of the Species Survival Program.

=== Nusa Penida island ===
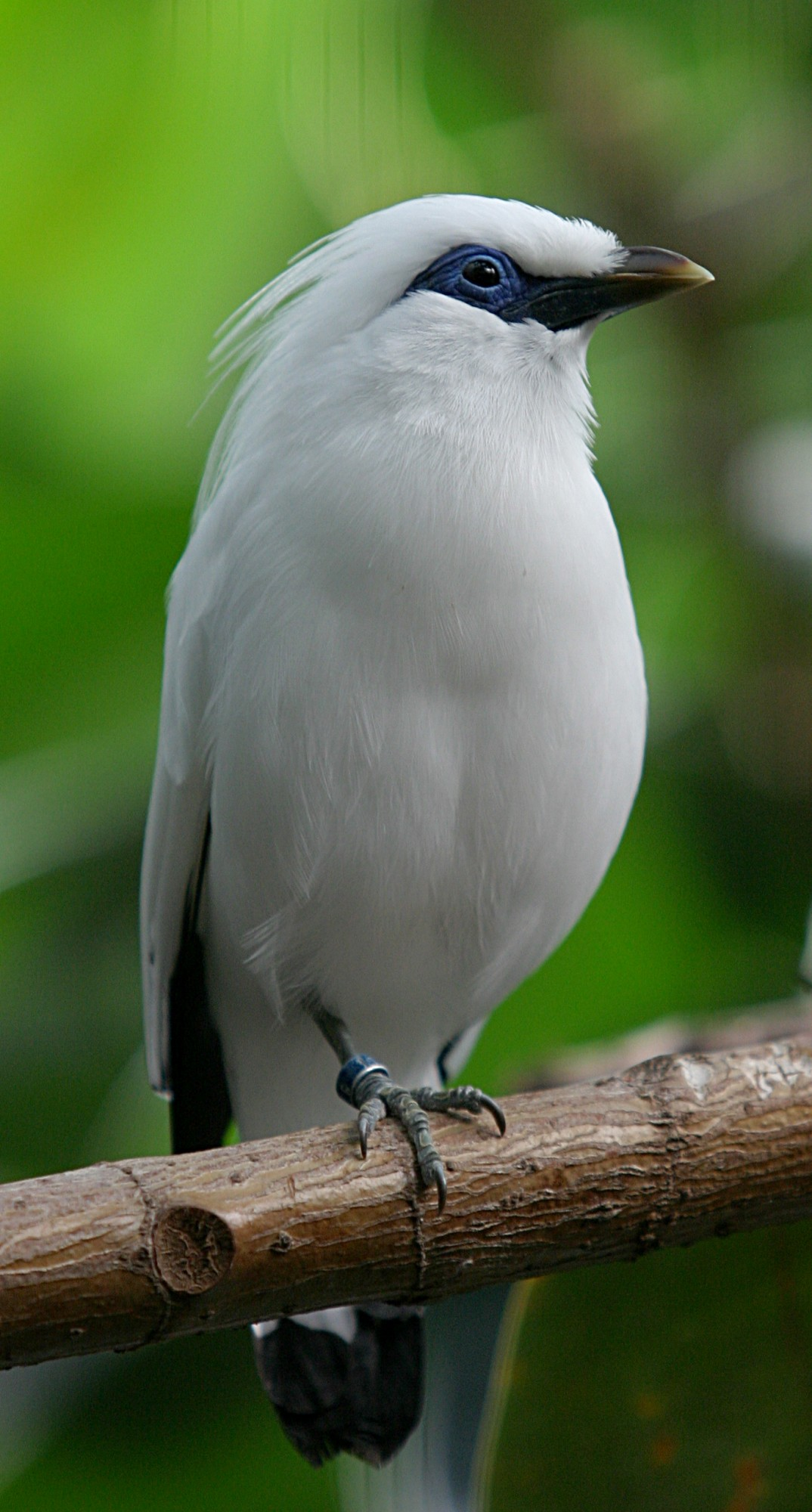
At Milwaukee County Zoological Gardens, United States

A population of Bali starling now exists on the island of Nusa Penida and its sister islands of Nusa Ceningan, Nusa Lembongan, which are 14 km (8.7 mi) off the south east coast of Bali. The islands have been transformed into an unofficial bird sanctuary by Friends of National Parks Foundation (FNPF), an Indonesian NGO based in Bali. This was achieved by FNPF working for many years with the 40+ villages on the islands and persuading every village to pass a traditional Balinese village regulation to protect birds, and effectively removing the threat of poachers. Since then, FNPF has rehabilitated and released several endangered birds onto the island of Nusa Penida, including many Bali starlings supplied from multiple breeders.

The Begawan Foundation began its Bali Starling Breeding Program in Begawan Giri in 1999 with two pairs, which had grown to a population of 97 in 2005. A release program was started on Nusa Penida, where 64 individuals were released in 2006 and 2007. Monitoring of the released birds suggests that their numbers had increased to +100 by 2009, and had spread across Penida, with small numbers also breeding on Ceningan and Lembongan. A number of further captive-bred individuals have since been rewilded, including 6 individuals on neighboring Nusa Lembongan. The foundation expects to release approximately 10 Bali starlings each year. The birds will continue to be sourced from different breeders to increase the genetic diversity of the growing wild population on Nusa Penida. Begawan Foundation field staff have monitored the released birds on a daily basis since their release and have a dedicated Field Officer since 2010. Findings are regularly reported to the Forestry Department, with photos and films taken of the birds' activities.

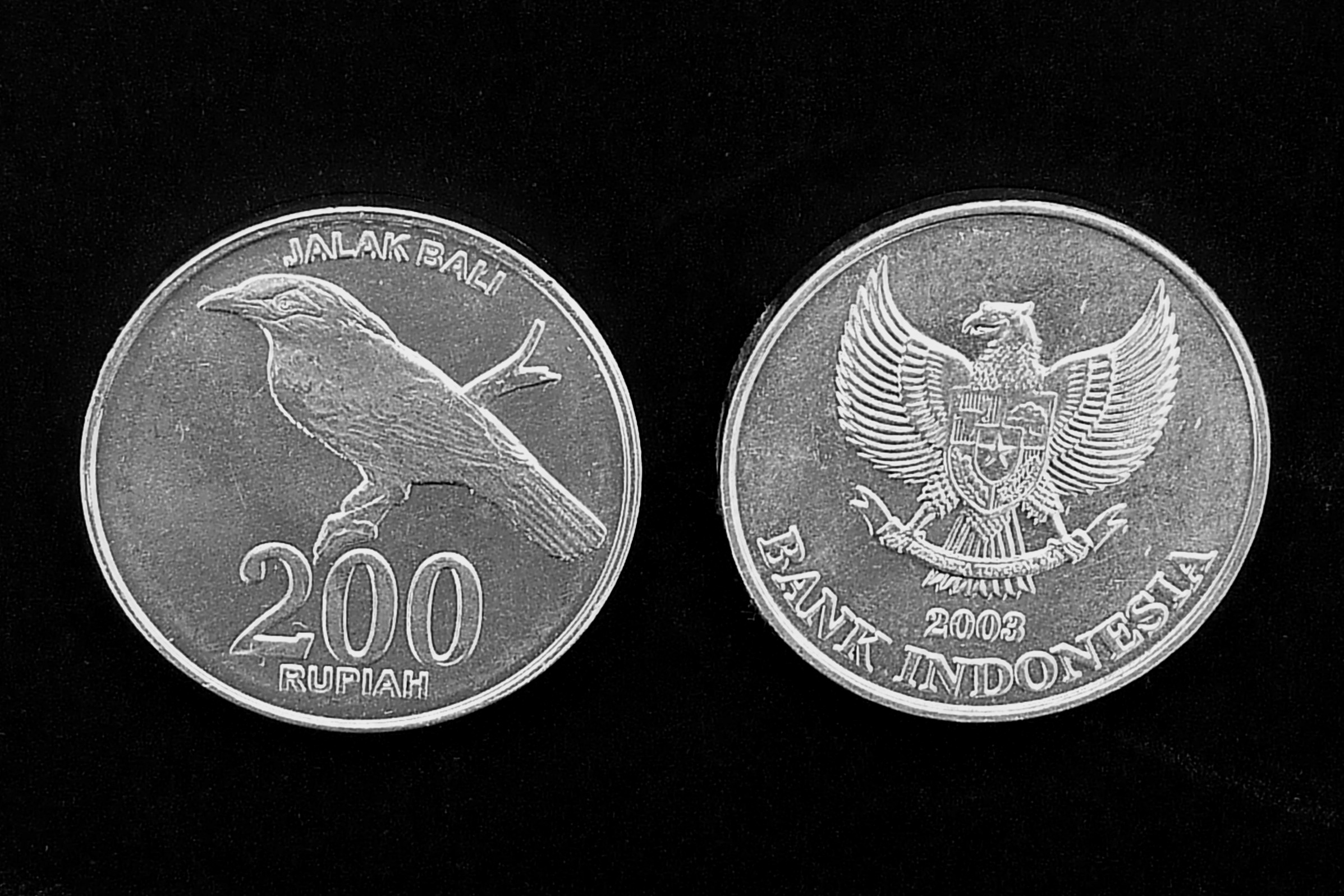
Coin with Bali starling

However, according to an audit undertaken by Begawan Foundation on both Nusa Penida and Nusa Lembongan in February and March 2015, less than 15 birds were seen to be flying in the wild. Calculations undertaken suggest that by 2015, even taking natural predation and death of older birds into account, there should be at least 200 birds flying on Nusa Penida today, indicating that illegal wildlife trade is heavily impacting the population.

=== Sibang, Central Bali ===
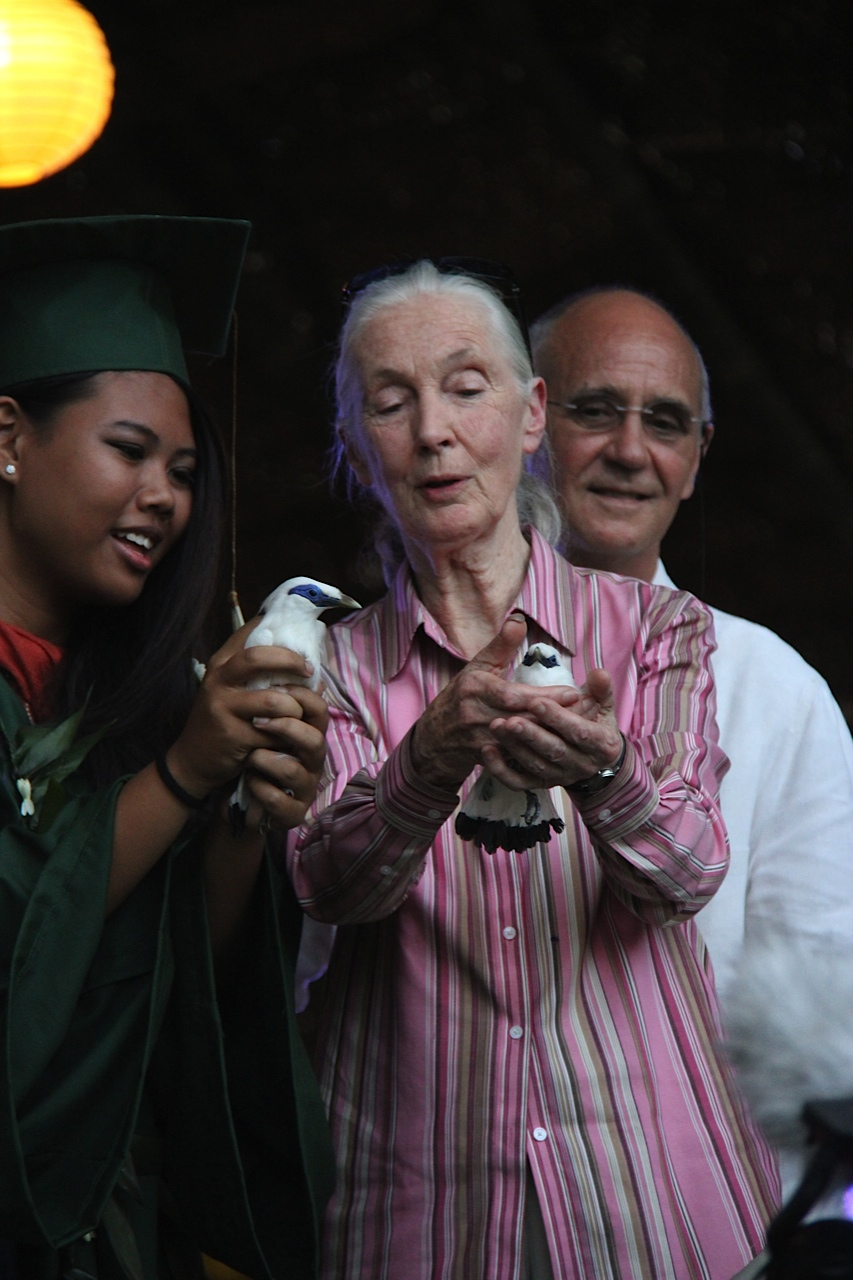
Dr Jane Goodall releases a Bali starling born and bred at Begawan Foundation's Breeding & Release Centre at Sibang, Bali.

In 2010, Begawan Foundation made a decision to move all its captive breeding Bali starlings from Nusa Penida to a new site at Sibang, near Ubud. The breeding program then recommenced with the aim to research new release sites close by. During 2011, a total of 23 Bali starlings were donated to BF's breeding program. Three birds were donated by Jurong Bird Park, and 20 came from a variety of zoos across Europe, members of the European Endangered Species Program, whose contributions of birds meant that new genetic lines would be introduced when the imported birds were paired with the local birds held at the breeding centre in Bali.

In November 2012 Begawan Foundation released four pairs of Bali starlings at its breeding site in Sibang. These birds were observed and their daily habits recorded by staff of the Foundation and students of the adjacent Green School. A program of conservation was undertaken with the local villages prior to the release and has the full support of the King of Sibang. Each bird has been ringed to identify it as it adapts to life in the wild. As this was a soft release, the birds often take the opportunity to return to the breeding site to find food and water. However, it is evident that new sources of fruit and a variety of insects are available in the immediate vicinity that provide a full and healthy diet for these birds and their offspring.

In 2014 there were three releases by Begawan Foundation at their site in Sibang. Three male birds and one female were released in April, with support from the local community. In June, Dr. Jane Goodall, during her visit to Bali, assisted in the release of two Bali starlings.

=== Melinggih Kelod, Payangan ===
In late 2017 Begawan Foundation decided to concentrate its programs in Mellingih kelod, Payangan, north of Ubud. A community-based conservation program began in the village in late 2017, providing local residents with the opportunity to breed Bali Starlings, and to be able to release F2 generation offspring within two years, and again in subsequent years. It is also envisaged that the community will be responsible for the safety of the Bali Starlings in the wild through serious monitoring and village traditional law enforcement. The Village officiated an "awik-awik" (local law) in November 2018, which has been signed by the Village Head as well as the Kelians (heads) of the banjars (village sections). The local law states that shooting/trapping/hunting the Bali Starling or any other protected wildlife in the area is prohibited. Any person from the community that is caught doing any of the above will pay a penalty of Rp10,000,000.

The Foundation also released a number of Starlings in late 2018, creating a wild flock of Bali Starlings in the Village, which is protected by the community. It is hoped that the soft releases will give the offspring the chance to reproduce in the wild and that a program of eco-tourism can be developed to provide income for the village.

Along with the community-based conservation program in Melinggih Kelod Village, the Foundation's Breeding and Release Centre has been relocated and is now centred in Banjar Begawan, one of the districts in the Village. This centre is open to the local community and the general public.
