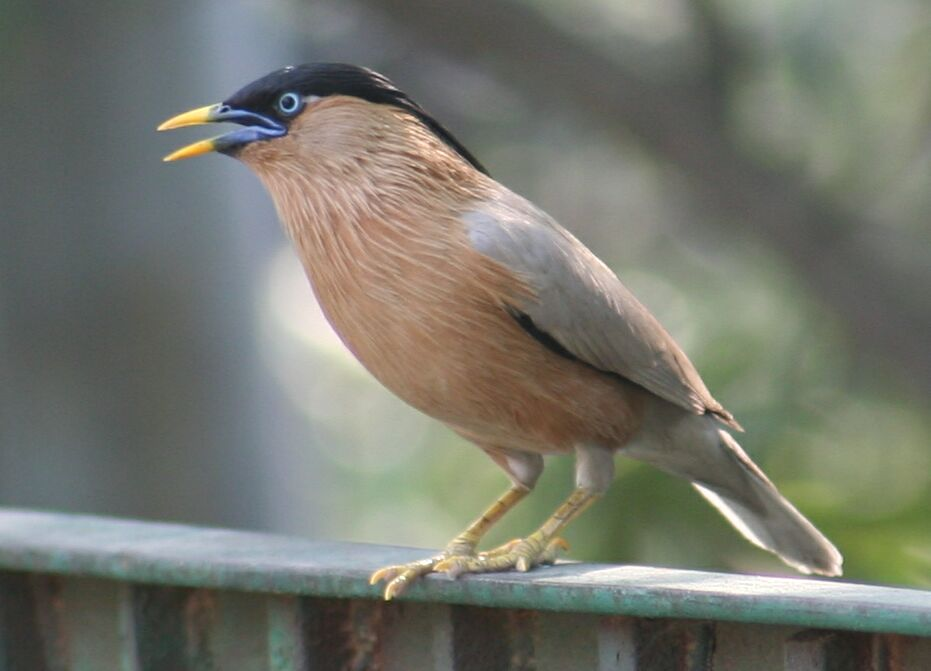
- Brahminy starling (Sturnia pagodarum)

Scientific classification
- Kingdom: Animalia
- Phylum: Chordata
- Class: Aves
- Order: Passeriformes
- Family: Sturnidae
- Genus: Sturnia; Lesson, 1837

Type species
- Pastor elegans Lesson, 1834

= Sturnia =

Genus of birds

Sturnia is a genus of Asian birds in the starling family Sturnidae. It was formerly often merged with Sturnus.

== Taxonomy ==
The genus Sturnia was introduced in 1837 by the French naturalist René Lesson. He designated the type species as Pastor elegans Lesson, 1834. This is a junior synonym of Oriolus sinensis Gmelin, 1778, the white-shouldered starling. The genus name is from Latin sturnus meaning "starling".

The old genus' placement with the starlings was found to be polyphyletic, resulting in changes in the placement. A 2008 study places the following species within this genus:

The genus contains five species:

Image	Scientific name	Common name	Distribution
	Sturnia sinensis	White-shouldered starling	southern China and northern Vietnam
	Sturnia malabarica	Chestnut-tailed starling	India and Southeast Asia
	Sturnia blythii	Malabar starling	southwest India
	Sturnia erythropygia	White-headed starling	Andaman and Nicobar Islands
	Sturnia pagodarum	Brahminy starling	Nepal and India, a winter visitor to Sri Lanka

Former taxonomic treatments have included:

- White-faced starling, Sturnia albofrontata (now Sturnornis albofrontatus).
- Daurian starling, Sturnia sturnina (now Agropsar sturninus).
- Chestnut-cheeked starling, Sturnia philippensis (now Agropsar philippensis).

If the first of these was to be included in Sturnia, it seems highly warranted also to include the monotypic genera Leucopsar (Bali myna) and Fregilupus (hoopoe starling), and perhaps the enigmatic Necropsar (Rodrigues starling), in Sturnia. On the other hand, if these distinct genera are maintained, the white-faced starling would then receive its own genus, Sturnornis.

The other two would better be dealt with by resurrecting Agropsar, either as a distinct genus or as a subgenus of Gracupica, which otherwise includes the black-collared starling ("Sturnus" nigricollis) and the pied mynas (Gracupica spp.); these four form a robust and ancient group of two sister species that is perhaps even closer to the wattled starling (Creatophpora cinerea) than to the genus Sturnus. Their similarity to Sturnia proper is probably simply a symplesiomorphy.
