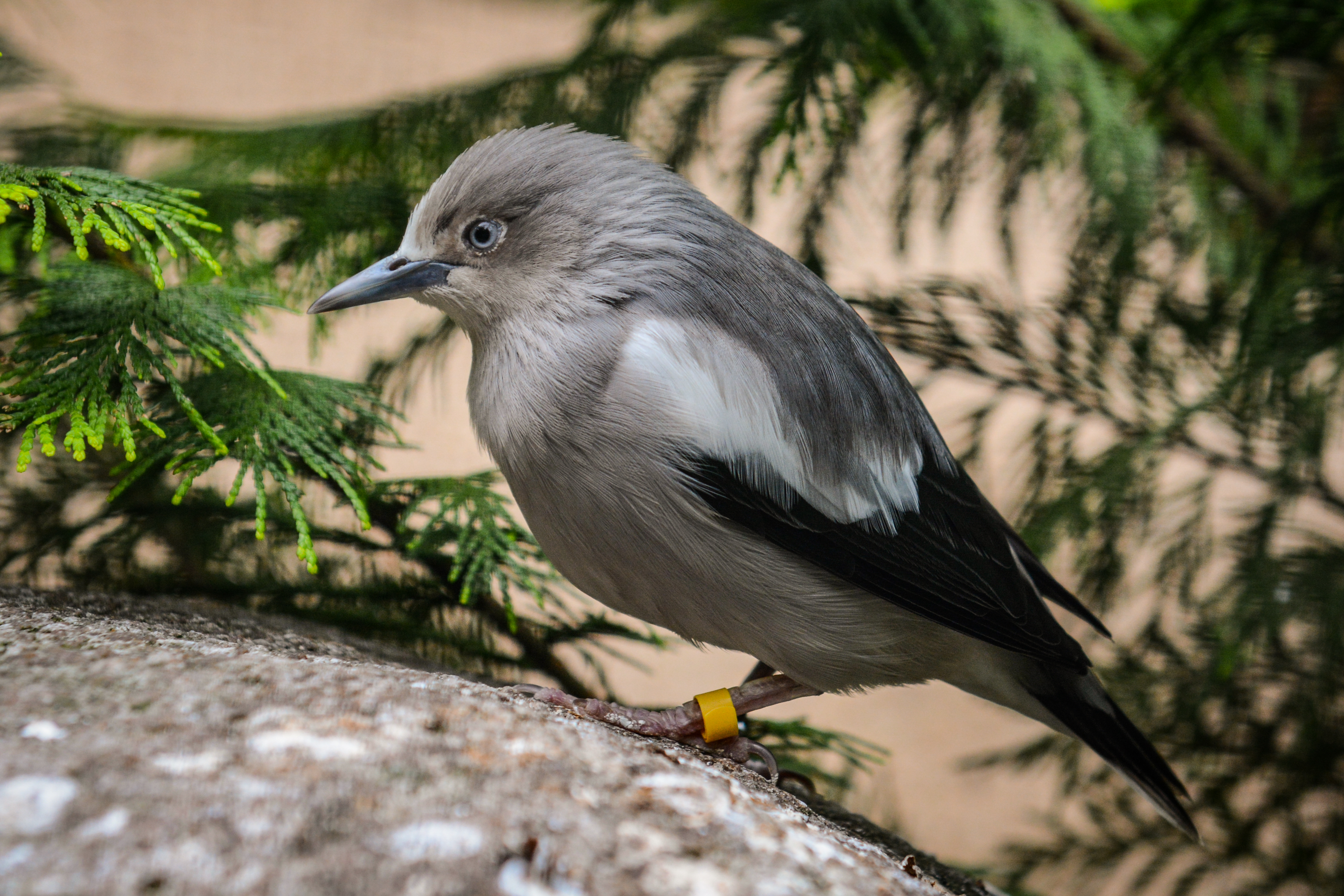

Conservation status
- Least Concern (IUCN 3.1)

Scientific classification
- Kingdom: Animalia
- Phylum: Chordata
- Class: Aves
- Order: Passeriformes
- Family: Sturnidae
- Genus: Sturnia
- Species: S. sinensis

Binomial name
- Sturnia sinensis (Gmelin, JF, 1788)

Synonyms
- Sturnus sinensis

= White-shouldered starling =

Species of bird

The white-shouldered starling (Sturnia sinensis) is a species of bird in the starling family Sturnidae. It breeds in southern China and northern Vietnam; it winters in Southeast Asia.

== Taxonomy ==
The white-shouldered starling was formally described in 1788 by the German naturalist Johann Friedrich Gmelin in his revised and expanded edition of Carl Linnaeus's Systema Naturae. He placed it with the orioles in the genus Oriolus and coined the binomial name Oriolus sinensis. The specific epithet sinensis is Modern Latin for "Chinese". Gmelin based his description on "Le Kink" from China that had been described in 1775 by the French polymath the Comte de Buffon in his Histoire Naturelle des Oiseaux. A hand-coloured engraving by François-Nicolas Martinet was published to accompany Buffon's text.

The white-shouldered starling was formerly placed in the genus Sturnus. A molecular phylogenetic study published in 2008 found the genus was polyphyletic. In the reorganization to create monotypic genera, the white-shouldered starling was one of five starlings moved to the resurrected genus Sturnia that had been introduced in 1837 by René Lesson. The species is monotypic: no subspecies are recognised.

== Description ==
The white-shouldered starling has blue eyes, a grey bill, and a white patch on the shoulder. The adult male has a light brown head and breast and a white belly while an adult female is darker brown on the back and belly. This bird is usually found in large flocks.

== Distribution and habitat ==
The bird can be found in Asian countries including Brunei, Cambodia, China, India, Japan, South Korea, Laos, Malaysia, Myanmar, Philippines, Singapore, Taiwan, Thailand and Vietnam. Common names for the white-shouldered starling are gray-backed myna, Chinese myna, Chinese starling, and Mandarin myna.

== Conservation status ==
The conservation status of the white-shouldered starling is that of "Least Concern".
