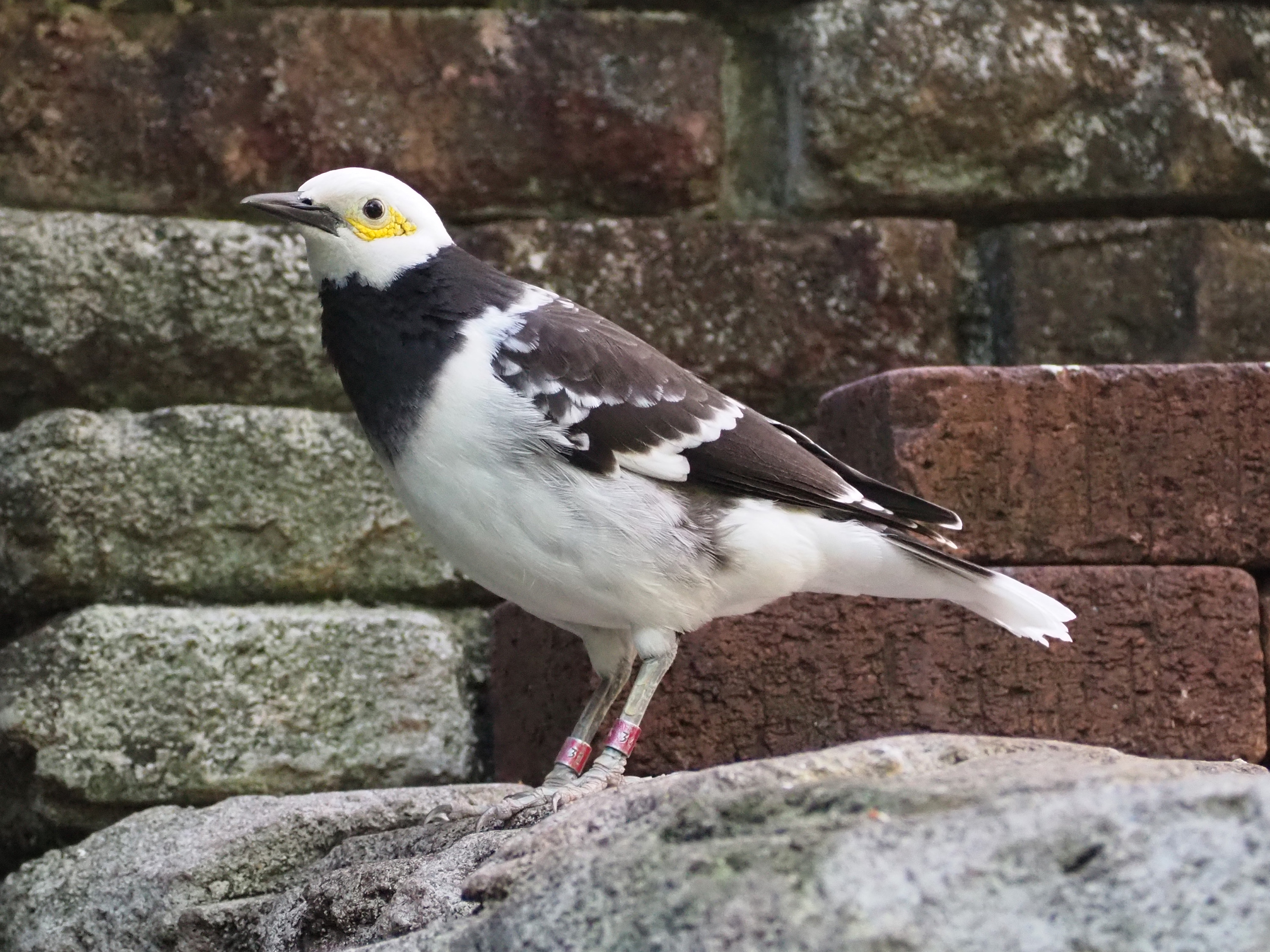

Conservation status
- Least Concern (IUCN 3.1)

Scientific classification
- Kingdom: Animalia
- Phylum: Chordata
- Class: Aves
- Order: Passeriformes
- Family: Sturnidae
- Genus: Gracupica
- Species: G. nigricollis

Binomial name
- Gracupica nigricollis (Paykull, 1807)
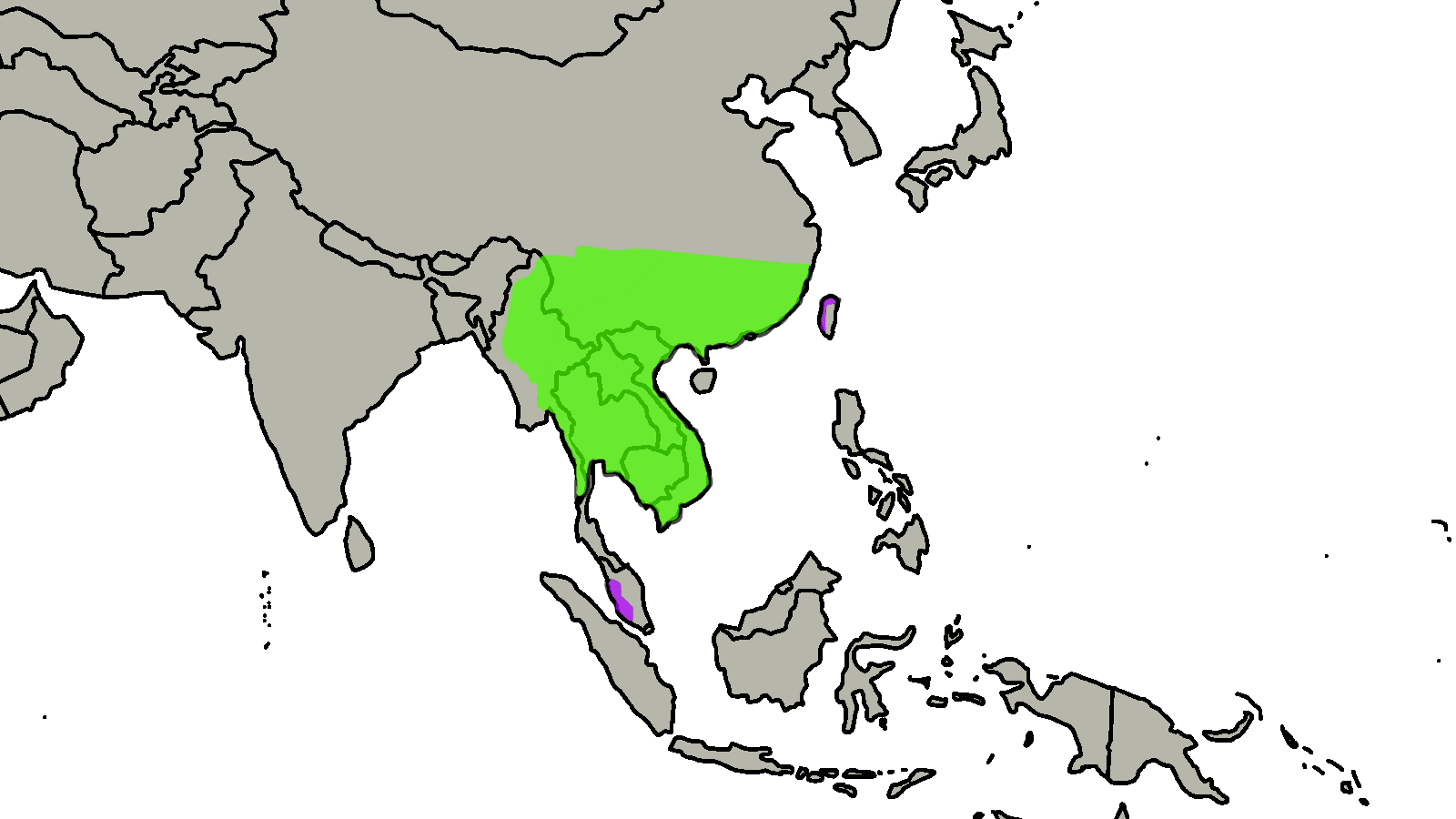
- Green: Extant (resident), Purple: Extant (resident and introduced)

Synonyms
- Sturnus nigricollis

Audio
- Call and song in Thailand, with an Asian koel and large billed crows in the background

= Black-collared starling =

Species of bird

The black-collared starling (Gracupica nigricollis) is a species of starling with black and white plumage and a black collar. It is found in southern China and most of mainland Southeast Asia, and has been introduced to Taiwan, Malaysia and Singapore. Its habitats include grassland, dry forest and human settlements. The International Union for Conservation of Nature (IUCN) has assessed it as being of least concern.

== Taxonomy ==
This species was described as Gracula nigricollis by Gustaf von Paykull in 1807. Formerly placed in the genus Sturnus, it and the Siamese pied myna (Gracupica floweri) were separated to the genus Gracupica when Sturnus was split, following phylogenetic studies in 2008. In the past it had also been placed in Sturnopastor, Acridotheres and Graculipica.

== Description ==
The black-collared starling is 26–30 cm (10–12 in) long. The head is white, with a yellow patch of bare skin around the eye, and a black collar around the neck. The mantle, back and wings are dark brown, appearing almost black. The underparts are white, often with a grey-brown tinge. The tail and most of the covert and flight feathers are tipped white, with the primary coverts completely white. The beak is black, and the legs are pale grey. The male and female are alike. The juvenile bird is browner and has a streaked neck and breast; it also has an eye-patch but not a collar.

== Distribution and habitat ==
This species is found in southern China from Fujian to Yunnan, and south to Burma, Laos, Cambodia, Vietnam and Thailand. An individual recorded in Brunei may be an escaped captive or a vagrant. It has been introduced to Taiwan, Malaysia and Singapore. This starling lives in grassland, dry forest, cultivated areas and human settlements, mostly occurring at low elevations, but also up to 2,000 m (6,600 ft).

== Behaviour ==
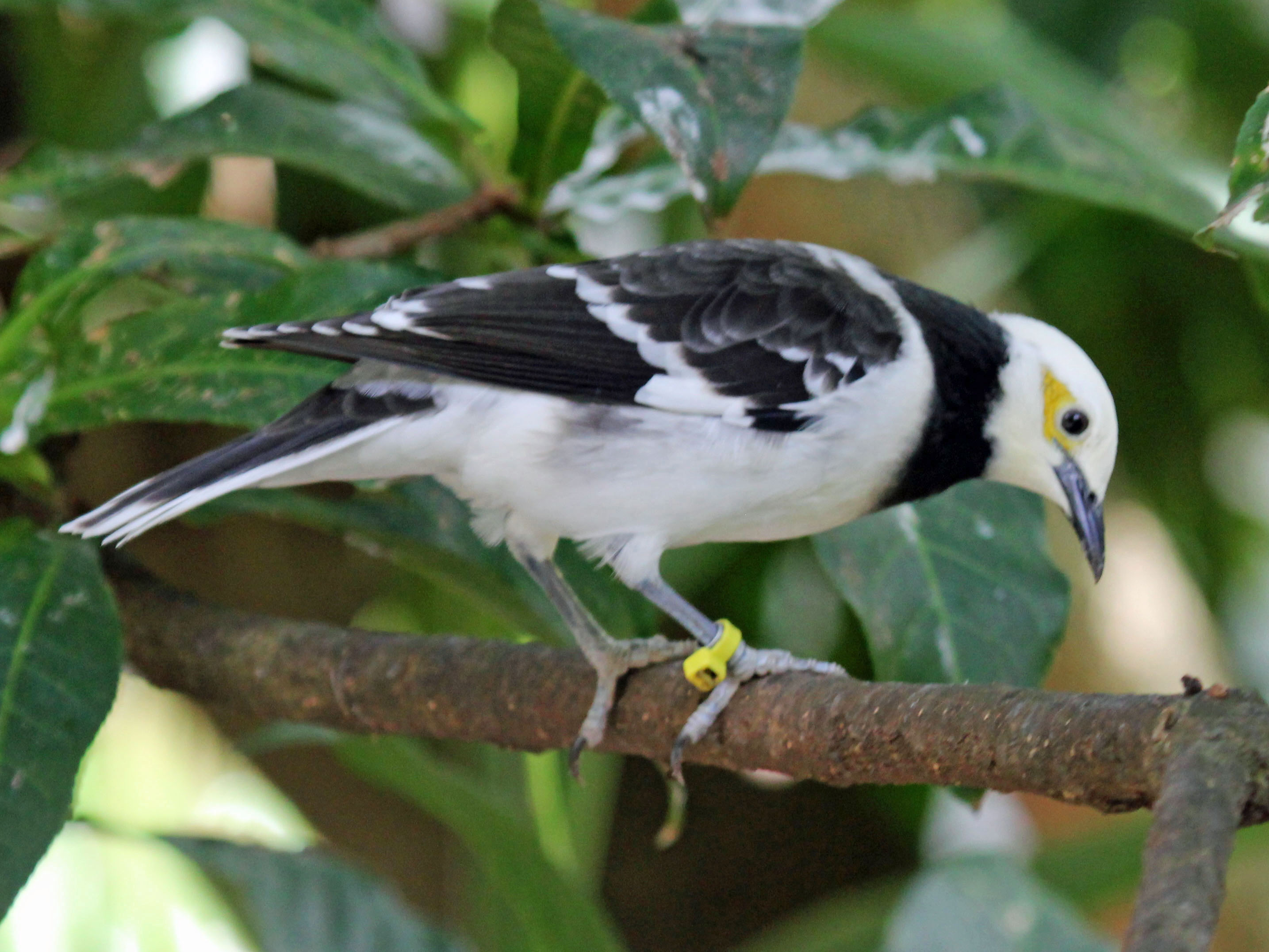
At a zoo in Miami

This starling forages on the ground, sometimes around livestock. It feeds on insects, earthworms and seeds. A very vocal bird, its calls include shrill, harsh, melodious and discordant notes, such as a jay-like kraak kraak, a whistling prrü resembling a bee-eater, and a pü-pü-pü-pü similar to a "hesitant" rufous-capped babbler. Its song is transcribed as tcheeuw-tchew-trieuw, with the bird puffing out its chest in order to sing as loudly as possible. Two courtship displays have been recorded. One consists of a pair facing each other, their feathers ruffled and beaks open. In the other, the pair droop their wings and bow their heads. Between displays, the pair run or fly after each other. Pairs also preen each other, a behaviour known as allopreening. The breeding season has been recorded as February to May in Thailand, March to July in China, and April to August in Burma. The large, domed nest is constructed from twigs, grasses, feathers and flowers. It is built on a tree, and may be re-used. Nesting colonies have been observed. Three to five eggs are laid per clutch.

== Status ==
Deforestation seems to have benefited this species, causing its range to expand. The population appears to be increasing, and the IUCN has assessed it as a least-concern species.
