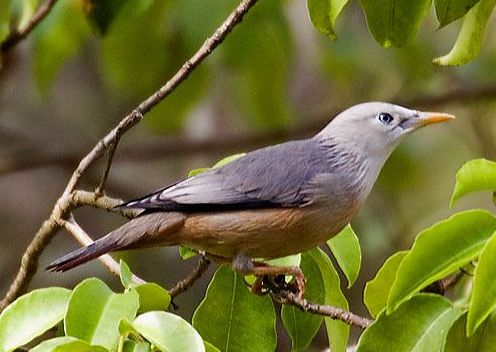

Scientific classification
- Kingdom: Animalia
- Phylum: Chordata
- Class: Aves
- Order: Passeriformes
- Family: Sturnidae
- Genus: Sturnia
- Species: S. blythii

Binomial name
- Sturnia blythii (Jerdon, 1845)
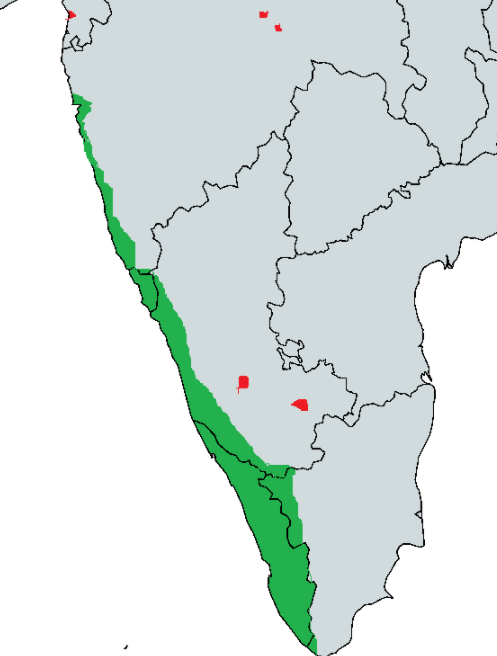
- Resident Vagrant

Synonyms
- Sturnus blythii

= Malabar starling =

Species of bird

The Malabar starling (Sturnia blythii) is a species of starling found in southwestern India. It was previously considered a subspecies of the chestnut-tailed starling.

They nest in tree holes 3-15 mm above the ground.

Nestlings eat insects, lepidopteran larvae, beetles, small vertebrates, and nectar.

== Taxonomy ==
The Malabar starling was formerly placed in the genus Sturnus. A molecular phylogenetic study published in 2008 found that the genus was polyphyletic. In the reoganization to create monotypic genera, the Malabar starling was one of five starlings moved to the resurrected genus Sturnia that had been introduced in 1837 by René Lesson. The species is monotypic: no subspecies are recognised. The Malabar starling was formerly considered to be conspecific with the chestnut-tailed starling (Sturnia malabarica).

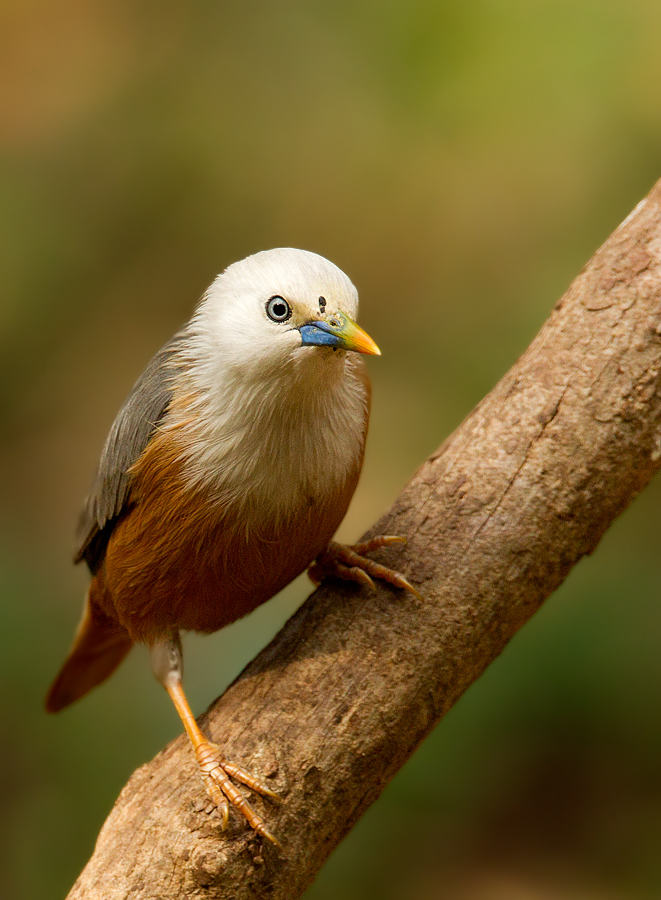
At Dandeli, India.
