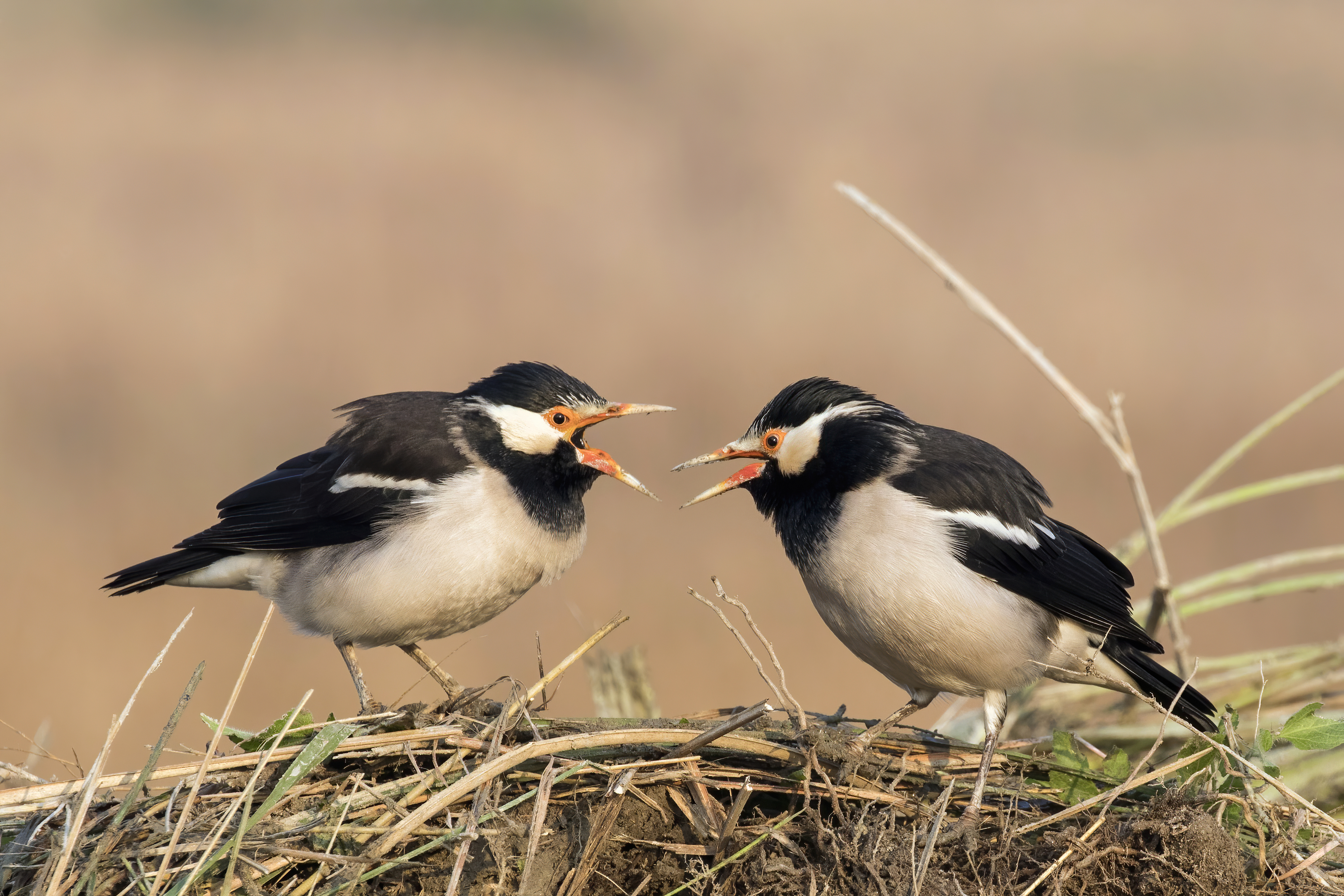
- Uttar Pradesh, India

Conservation status
- Least Concern (IUCN 3.1)

Scientific classification
- Kingdom: Animalia
- Phylum: Chordata
- Class: Aves
- Order: Passeriformes
- Family: Sturnidae
- Genus: Gracupica
- Species: G. contra

Binomial name
- Gracupica contra (Linnaeus, 1758)

Synonyms
- Sturnus contra Linnaeus, 1758

Audio

= Indian pied myna =

Species of bird

The Indian pied myna (Gracupica contra) is a species of starling found in the Indian subcontinent. It is usually found in small groups mainly on the plains and low foothills. It is often seen within cities and villages although it is not as bold as the common myna. It produces a range of calls made up of liquid notes.

== Taxonomy ==
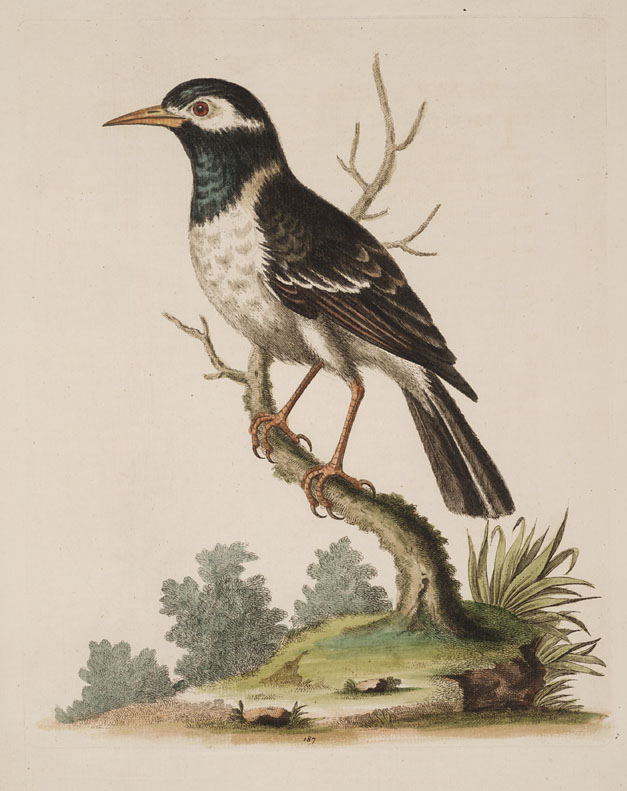
An early illustration by George Edwards (1751)

The Indian pied myna was formally described by the Swedish naturalist Carl Linnaeus in 1758 in the tenth edition of his Systema Naturae under the binomial name Sturnus contra. Linnaeus based his description on the "Contra, from Bengall" that had been described and illustrated in 1738 by Eleazar Albin and the "Black and White Indian Starling" that had been described and illustrated in 1751 by George Edwards. Albin believed that "contra" was the Bengali word for this species, but this name was not known in the 19th century. Linnaeus specified the type locality as India but this was restricted to Calcutta by the British ornithologist E. C. Stuart Baker in 1921. In the past the Indian pied myna has been included in the genera Sturnus and Sturnopastor but based on results from molecular phylogenetic analysis published in 2008 it is now placed in the resurrected genus Gracupica that had been introduced in 1831 by the French naturalist René Lesson.

Two subspecies are recognised:

- G. c. contra (Linnaeus, 1758) – east Pakistan, north, central, India, south Nepal and Bangladesh (includes sordida)
- G. c. superciliaris (Blyth, 1863) – Manipur (northeast India), north, central, southeast Myanmar and southwest China

It is found mainly along the Gangetic plains extending south into Andhra Pradesh and east to Bangladesh. The population in northeastern India (Sadiya to Tirap and the Naga Hills) was named as sordida (originally Sturnus contra sordidus) by Sidney Dillon Ripley in 1950. This form differs from the Indian form in having reduced streaking on the shoulders and nape. The populations in Manipur south to Myanmar and east to Yunnan have the white extending over the eye and are included in the subspecies superciliaris first described by Edward Blyth in 1863.

A 2021 study found that G. contra represents a species complex of 3 distinct species: the Indian pied myna (G. contra sensu stricto) from most of the Indian Subcontinent, Myanmar, and Yunnan in China, with subspecies sordida and superciliaris; the monotypic Siamese pied myna (G. floweri) from Thailand and Cambodia, and the monotypic possibly extinct in the wild Javan pied myna(G. jalla), historically known from Java and Bali in Indonesia. G. jalla was likely driven to extinction in the wild due to the illegal songbird trade becoming increasingly pervasive in Indonesia, and in captivity it is likely threatened by hybridization with captured individuals of mainland pied myna species. It has been recommended to search for genetically pure members of the species in the wildlife trade for the purpose of captive breeding; a potential captive population of pure G. jalla exists at Bali Bird Park.

== Description ==
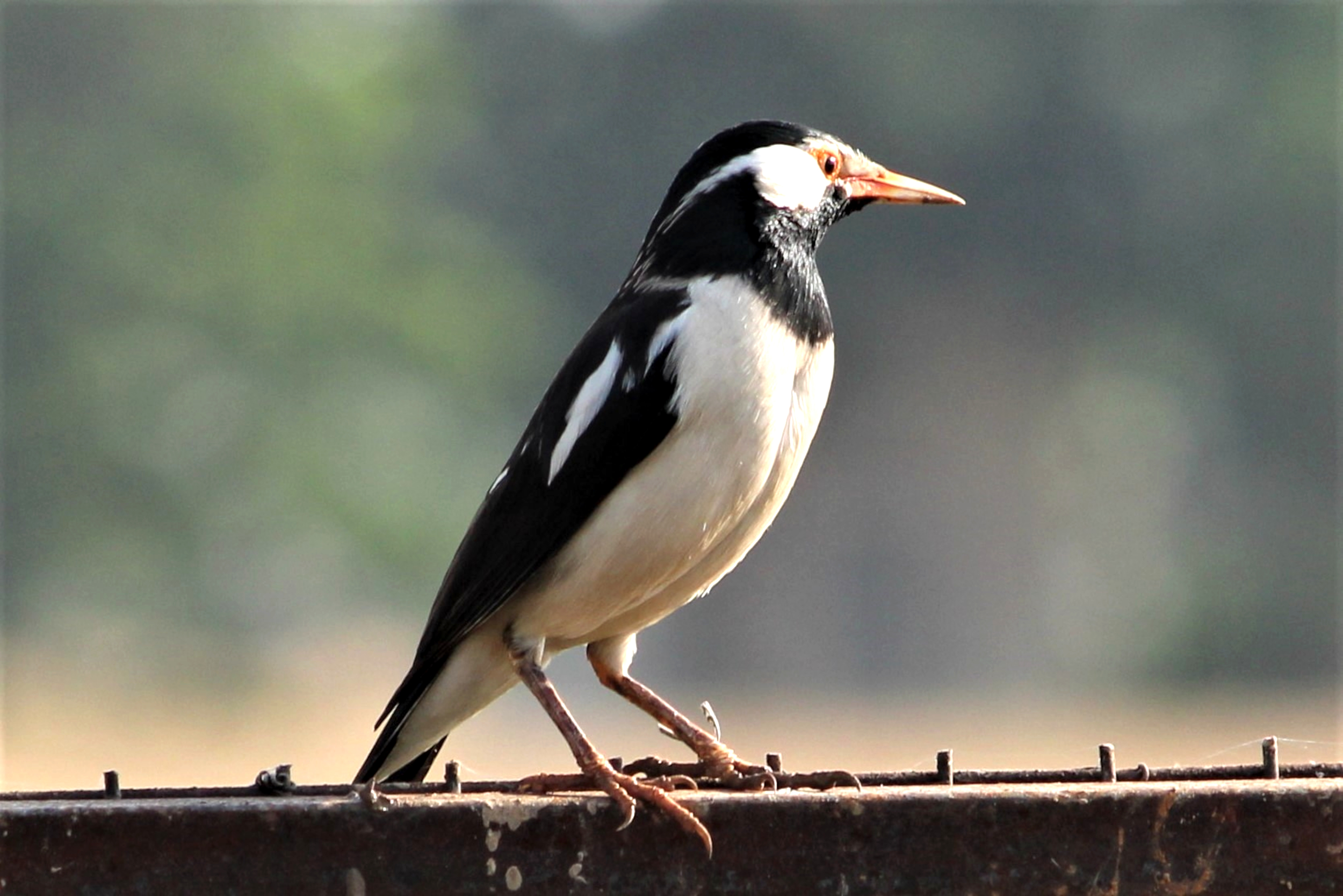
Asian pied starling (pied myna)

This myna is strikingly marked in black and white and has a yellowish bill with a reddish bill base. The bare skin around the eye is reddish. The upper body, throat and breast are black while the cheek, lores, wing coverts and rump are contrastingly white. The sexes are similar in plumage but young birds have dark brown in place of black. The subspecies vary slightly in plumage, extent of streaking of the feathers and in measurements.

The flight is slow and butterfly-like on round wings.

Leucistic individuals have been recorded.

== Distribution and habitat ==
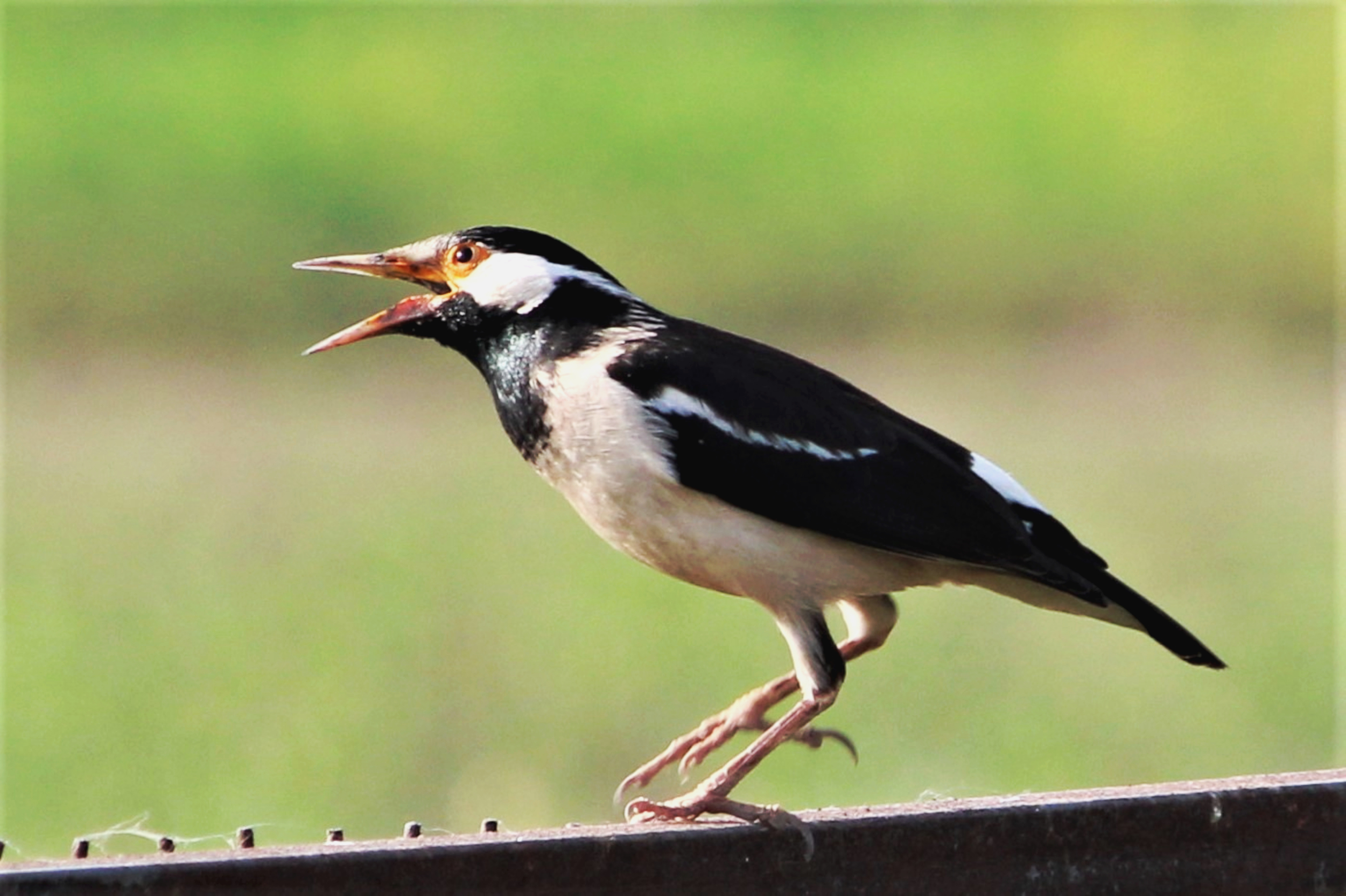
Asian Pied Starling (Pied Myna) near Chandigarh.

The species is found mainly in the plains but in the foothills up to about 700m above sea level. They are found mainly in areas with access to open water. Their main distribution in India is from the Gangetic plains extending south to the Krishna River. Their range is increasing, with populations establishing more recently in Pakistan, Rajkot, and Bombay (since 1953), possibly aided by trade in caged birds and accidental escape. Their westerward spread in India particularly in parts of Rajasthan has been aided by changes in irrigation and farming patterns. The species has also established itself in the United Arab Emirates.

The habitat is lowland open areas with scattered trees near water, often near human habitation. This species is often seen at sewage farms and refuse tips.

== Behaviour ==
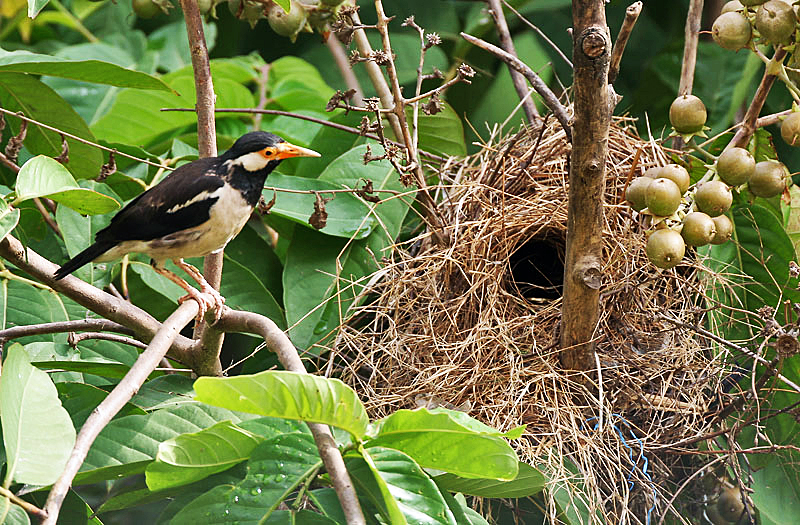
Nest

These starlings are usually found in small groups, foraging mainly on the ground but perching on trees and buildings. Birds in a group call frequently with a wide repertoire that includes whistles, trills, buzzes, clicks, and warbling calls. Young birds taken into captivity have been trained to imitate tunes of other birds.

Both sexes sing. They forage in fields, lawns and on open ground feeding on grains, fruit, insects, earthworms and molluscs usually taken from the ground. Like many other starlings, they often use a prying or gaping action, piercing soil and then opening apart the bill to dislodge hidden food. The strong protractor muscles allow them to part a mat of grass and their eyes are positioned to obtain a binocular view of the space between the parted beak. They often feed in grazing land or among cattle.

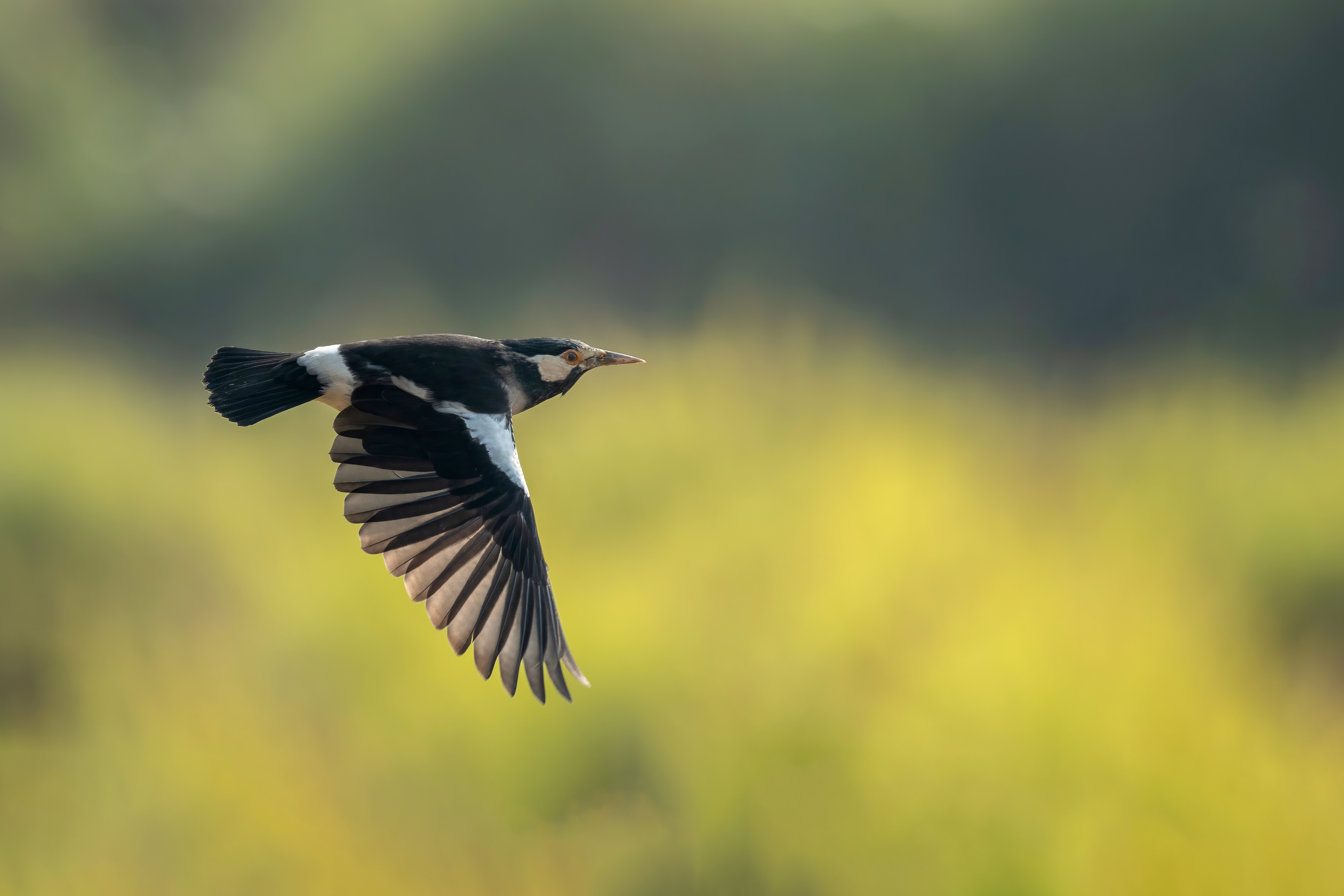
In flight, Nepal

The breeding season in India is spread from March to September. With the onset of breeding, the sizes of flocks decline and birds pair up. Courtship involves calling, fluffing of the feathers and head bobbing. The nest is a loose mass of straw formed into a dome with an entrance on the side and placed in a large tree (often banyan, mango, jackfruit, rosewood) or sometimes on man-made structures, often close to human habitation. Several pairs will breed in the same vicinity. The usual clutch is made up of about four to six glossy blue eggs. Each egg is laid with a day in between and incubation begins only after the third or fourth egg is laid. The eggs hatch after 14 to 15 days. The young are brooded for two weeks, the female staying at the nest during the night. Both parents feed the chicks until they fledge and leave after three weeks. More than one brood may be raised in a season.

An instance of interspecific feeding, where an adult of a common myna fed a young Indian pied myna has been reported.

These mynas form communal roosts at night and jointly defend nesting areas.

== In culture ==
The ability of these mynas to mimic human voices made them popular as cagebirds. The Sema Nagas will not eat this bird as they believe it is the reincarnation of a human. They are considered to be generally beneficial because they eat many insects.

== General and cited references ==
- Chawla, G. (1993). Ecological studies on the Pied Myna (Sturnus contra) in an intensively cultivated area. M.Sc. Thesis, Punjab Agricultural University, Ludhiana.
- Gupta, AP (1982). "About the distribution of birds". Newsletter for Birdwatchers. 22(2):10
- Gupta, SK & BR Maiti (1986). "Study of atresia in the ovary during the annual reproductive cycle and nesting cycle of the pied myna". Journal of Morphology. 190 (3): 285–296. doi:10.1002/jmor.1051900305. PMID 29954160. S2CID 49588404.
- Gupta SK & B. R. Maiti (1987). "The male sex accessories in the annual reproductive cycle of the Pied Myna Sturnus contra contra". J. Yamashina Inst. Ornithol. 19: 45–55. doi:10.3312/jyio1952.19.45.
- Islam, M. S. (2001). "Southward Migration of Shorebirds in the Ganges Delta, Bangladesh" (PDF). The Stilt. 39 (31–36): 34. Archived from the original (PDF) on 2013-04-24.
- Narang, ML; Lamba, BS (1976). "On the feeding-time and feeding-area preference of Indian Pied Myna, Sturnus contra" Linn. Newsl. Zool. Surv. India 2(3), 83–86.
- Ray, D (1972). "Pied Myna Sturnus contra in Delhi". Newsletter for Birdwatchers. 12(10):11.
- Saini, Harjeet K; Chawla, Geeta; Dhindsa, Manjit S (1995): "Food of Pied Myna Sturnus contra in the agroecosystem of Punjab". Pavo 33(1&2):47–62.
- Tyagi, A.K.; Lamba, B.S. (1984). A contribution to the breeding biology of two Indian mynas. Miscellaneous publication. Occasional paper no. 5. Calcutta: Zoological Survey of India.
