= Pied myna =

Pied myna has been split into three species:

- Indian pied myna, Gracupica contra
- Siamese pied myna, Gracupica floweri
- Javan pied myna, Gracupica jalla
