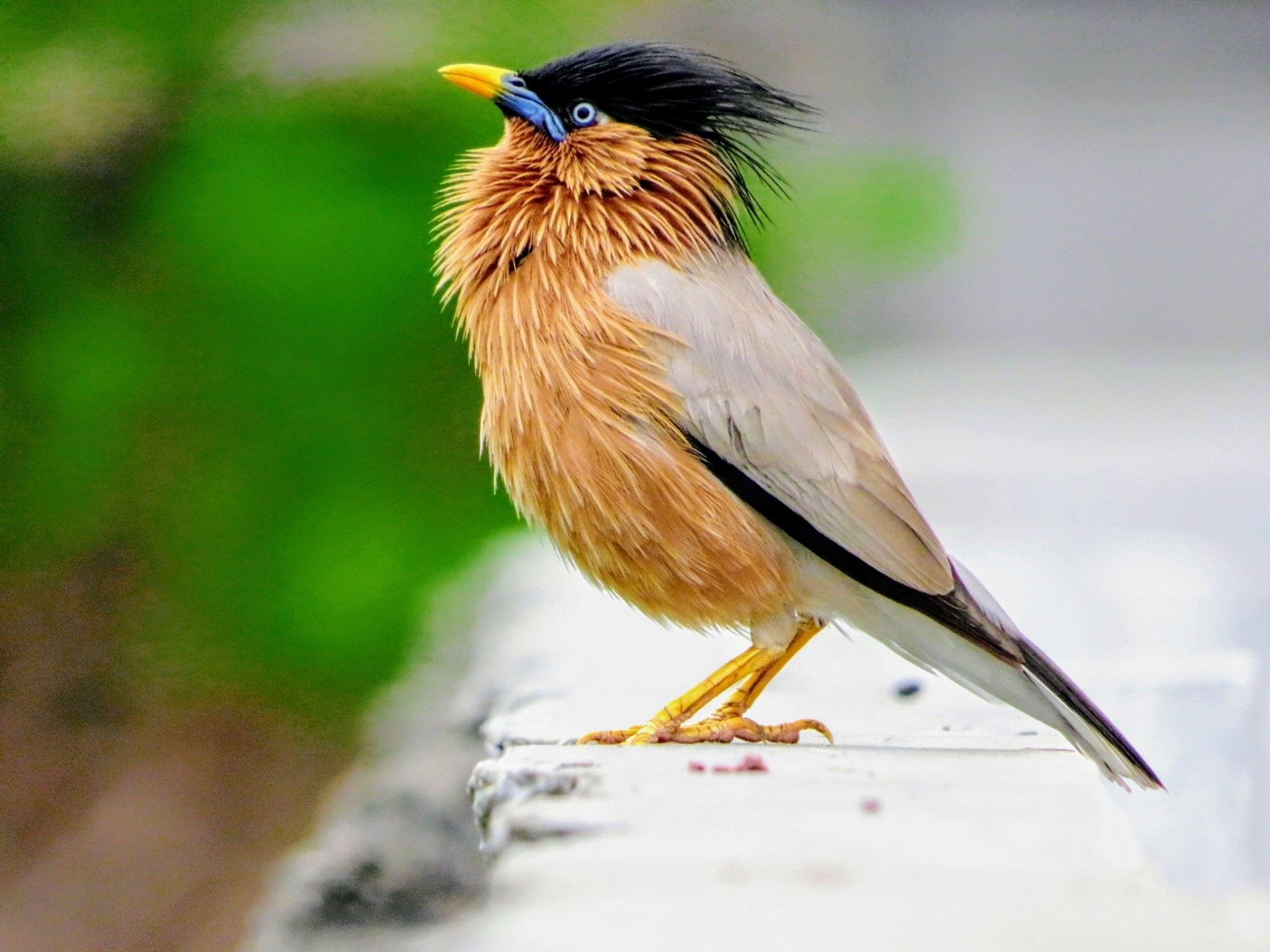
- Male displaying, Gujarat
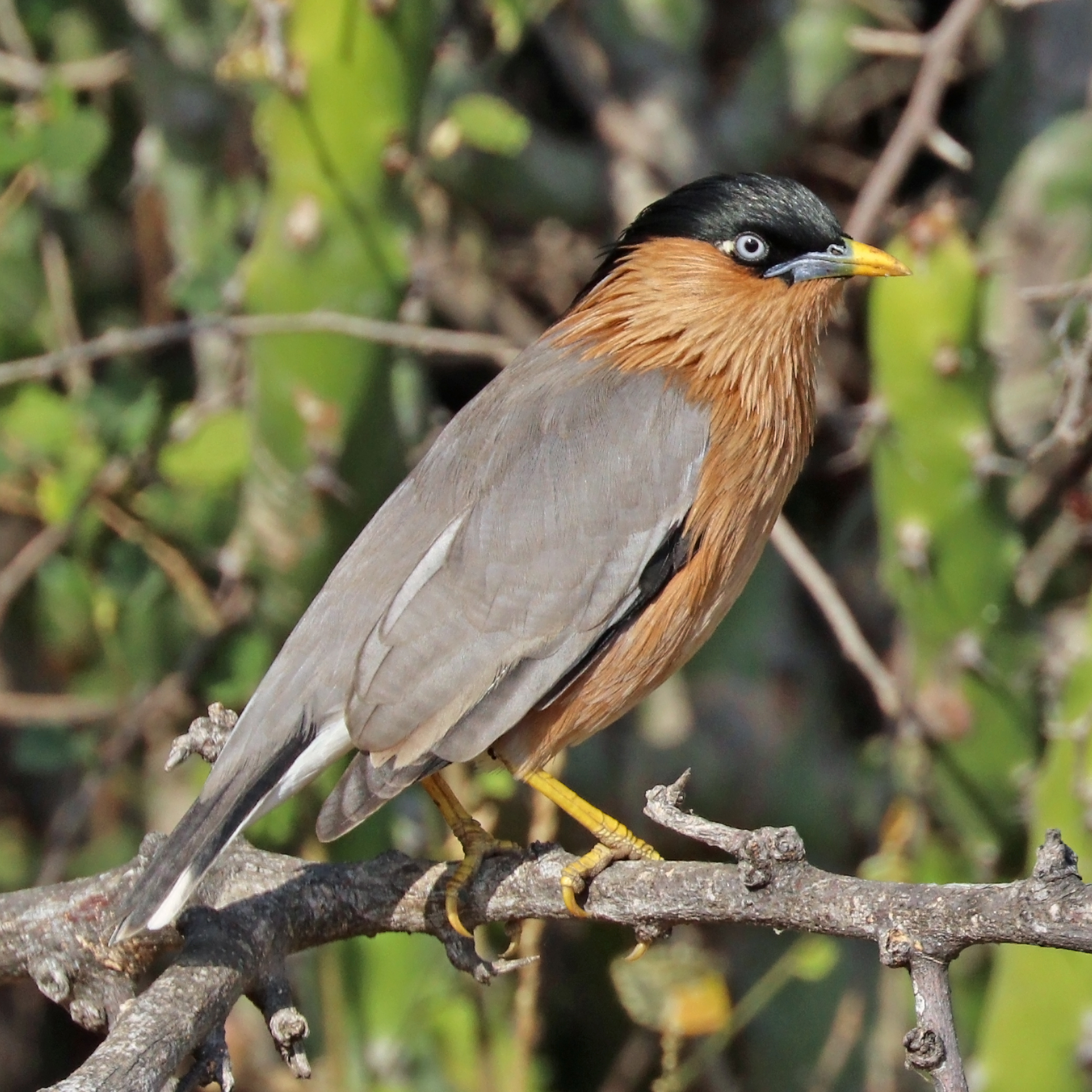
- Female in Rajasthan, India

Conservation status
- Least Concern (IUCN 3.1)

Scientific classification
- Kingdom: Animalia
- Phylum: Chordata
- Class: Aves
- Order: Passeriformes
- Family: Sturnidae
- Genus: Sturnia
- Species: S. pagodarum

Binomial name
- Sturnia pagodarum (Gmelin, JF, 1789)

Synonyms
- Sturnus pagodarum Temenuchus pagodarum

= Brahminy starling =

Species of bird

The brahminy starling or brahminy myna (Sturnia pagodarum) is a member of the starling family of birds. It is usually seen in pairs or small flocks in open habitats on the plains of the Indian subcontinent.

== Taxonomy ==
The brahminy starling was formally described in 1789 by the German naturalist Johann Friedrich Gmelin in his revised and expanded edition of Carl Linnaeus's Systema Naturae. He placed it with the thrushes in the genus Turdus and coined the binomial name Turdus pagodarum. The specific epithet pagodarum is Modern Latin meaning "of the temples" or "of the pagodas". Gmelin based his account on the "Le Martin Brame" that had been described in 1782 by the French naturalist Pierre Sonnerat in his book Voyage aux Indes orientales et à la Chine. Sonnerat mentioned that the bird was found on the Malabar and Coromandel Coasts of India.

The brahminy starling was formerly placed in the genus Sturnus. A molecular phylogenetic study published in 2008 found that the genus was polyphyletic. In the reoganization to create monotypic genera, the brahminy starling was one of five starlings moved to the resurrected genus Sturnia that had been introduced in 1837 by René Lesson. The species is monotypic: no subspecies are recognised.

== Description ==
This myna is pale buff creamy with a black cap and a loose crest. The bill is yellow with a bluish base. The iris is pale and there is a bluish patch of skin around the eye. The outer tail feathers have white and the black primaries of the wings do not have any white patches. The adult male has a more prominent crest than the female and also has longer neck hackles. Juveniles are duller and the cap is browner.

The species name pagodarum is thought to be based on occurrence of the species on buildings and temple pagodas in southern India.

== Distribution and habitat ==
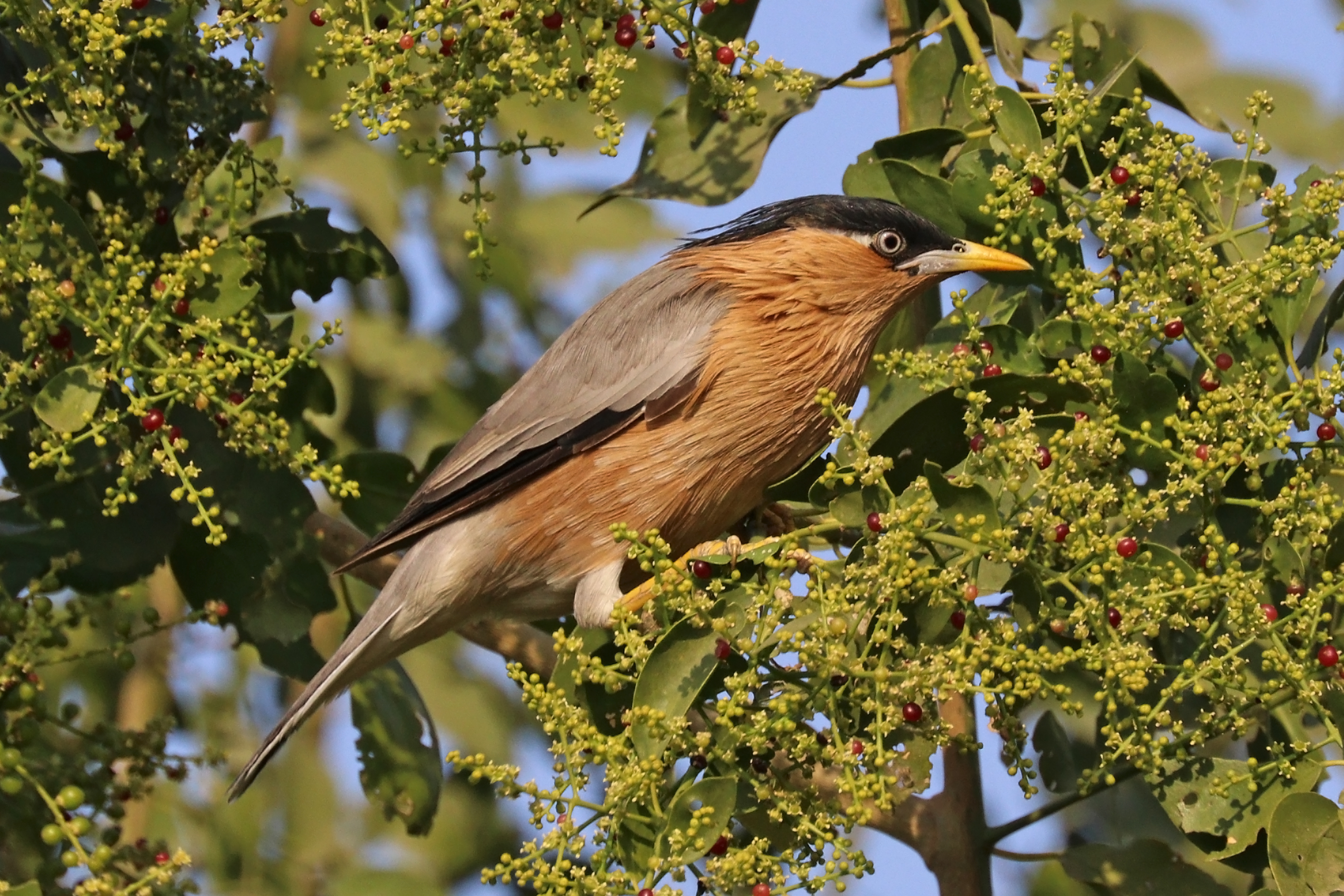
A young bird with the base of the mandible grey, Rajasthan

It is a resident breeder in Nepal and India, a winter visitor to Sri Lanka and a summer visitor in parts of the western and northeastern Himalayas. They are spotted in the plains of Pakistan as well. They have musical call notes that are long, made up of a series of slurred notes that end abruptly. Although mainly seen on the plains, there are a few records from above 3,000m, mainly from Ladakh.

This passerine is typically found in dry forest, scrub jungle and cultivation and is often found close to human habitations. They especially favour areas with waterlogged or marshy lands.

== Behaviour and ecology ==
=== Food and feeding ===
Like most starlings, the brahminy starling is omnivorous, eating fruit and insects. They have been known to feed on the fruits of Thevetia peruviana which are toxic to many vertebrates. These birds are not as arboreal as the grey-headed mynas and they form small flocks that mix with other mynas on grass covered ground. They sometimes forage beside grazing cattle. They also visit flowers for nectar, particularly Salmalia, Butea monosperma and Erythrina. They roost communally in large numbers in leafy trees, often in the company of parakeets and other mynas.

=== Breeding ===
Brahminy starling (Sturnia pagodarum) call, from koottanad Palakkad, Kerala, India

It builds its nest in tree holes or artificial cavities. The breeding season is March to September but varies with location, being earlier in southern India. The season coincides with the fruiting of many plants and the young hatch just as the rains begin. The male selects the nest, sometimes having to compete with other hole-nesters such as barbets and sparrows. The male displays by puffing up feathers, fanning the tail, erecting the crest and raising up its bill. Both sexes take part in nest building. The nest is lined with grass, feathers and rags. The normal clutch is three to four eggs which are pale bluish green. The females do not add replacement eggs when eggs are removed nor do they stop laying if an egg is artificially added. Incubation begins only after laying the second egg with the female brooding at night with the male share limited to brief periods during the day. The eggs hatch in about 12 to 14 days. The young fledge and leave the nest when they are three weeks old. The young are fed with insects in the early stages and grains in the later stages. After feeding the parents wait for the young to eject faecal pellets which they carefully remove and drop about 20 metres (66 ft) away from the nest. Two or three broods may be raised in succession.
