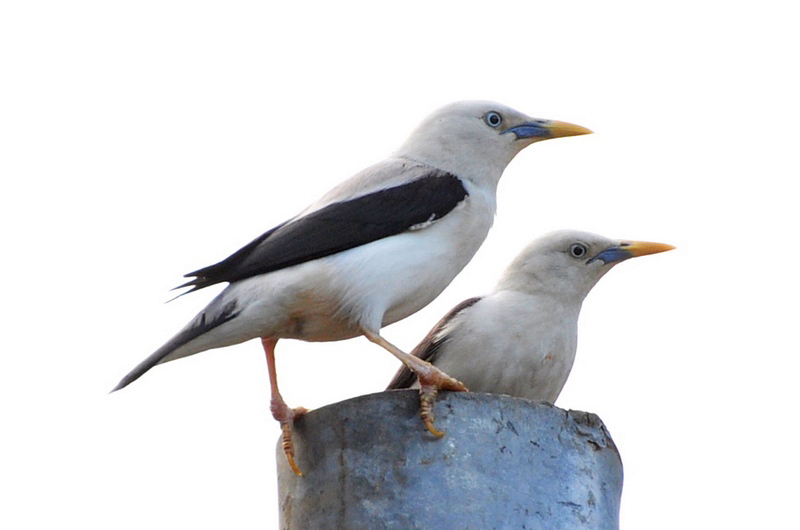

Conservation status
- Least Concern (IUCN 3.1)

Scientific classification
- Kingdom: Animalia
- Phylum: Chordata
- Class: Aves
- Order: Passeriformes
- Family: Sturnidae
- Genus: Sturnia
- Species: S. erythropygia

Binomial name
- Sturnia erythropygia Blyth, 1846

Synonyms
- Sturnus erythropygius

= White-headed starling =

Species of bird

The white-headed starling (Sturnia erythropygia), also known as the Andaman white-headed starling, is a species of starling in the family Sturnidae. It is found in wooded habitats of the Andaman and Nicobar Islands.

== Taxonomy ==
The white-headed starling was formerly placed in the genus Sturnus. A molecular phylogenetic study published in 2008 found that the genus was polyphyletic. In the reoganization to create monotypic genera, the white-headed starling was one of five starlings moved to the resurrected genus Sturnia that had been introduced in 1837 by René Lesson.

Three subspecies are recognised:

- S. e. andamanensis (Beavan, 1867) – Andaman Islands
- S. e. erythropygia Blyth, 1846 – north Nicobar Islands
- S. e. katchalensis Richmond, 1902 – central Nicobar Islands
