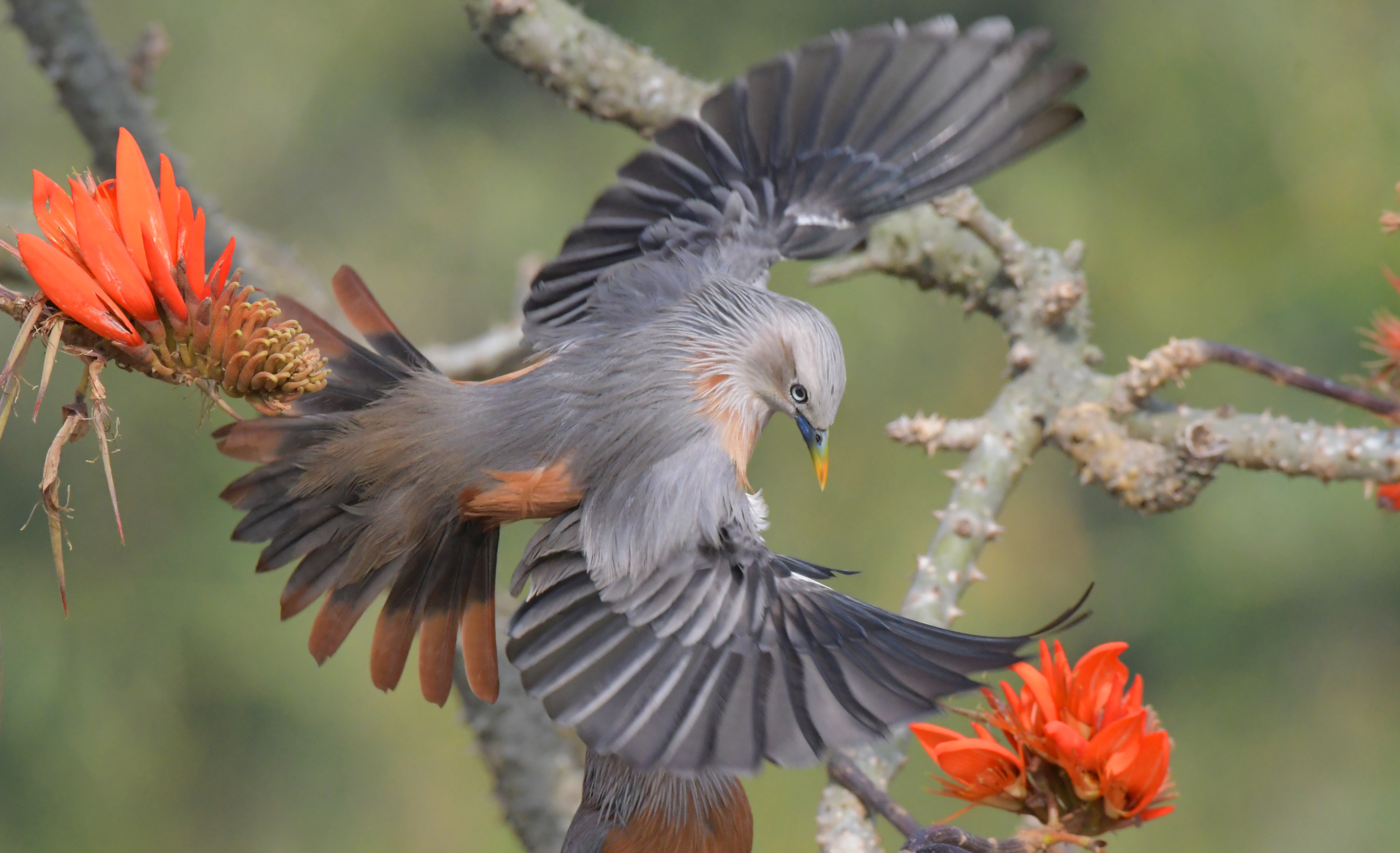
- Chestnut-tailed starling in Satchari National Park

Conservation status
- Least Concern (IUCN 3.1)

Scientific classification
- Kingdom: Animalia
- Phylum: Chordata
- Class: Aves
- Order: Passeriformes
- Family: Sturnidae
- Genus: Sturnia
- Species: S. malabarica

Binomial name
- Sturnia malabarica (Gmelin, 1789)
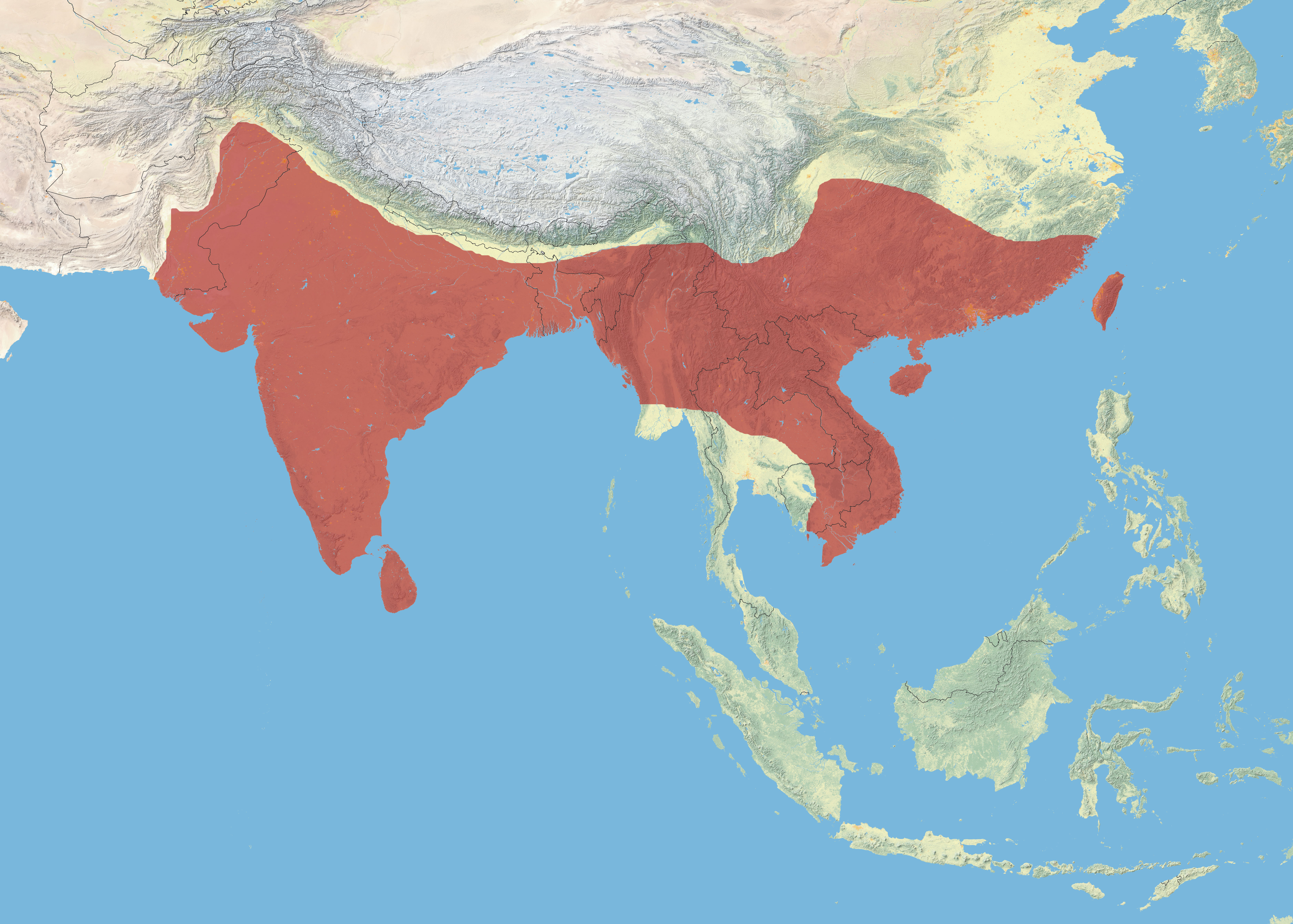
- approximate range

Synonyms
- Temenuchus malabaricus

= Chestnut-tailed starling =

Species of bird

The chestnut-tailed starling (Sturnia malabarica), also called grey-headed starling and grey-headed myna is a member of the starling family. It is a resident or partially migratory species found in wooded habitats in India and Southeast Asia. The species name is after the distribution of a former subspecies in the Malabar region. While the chestnut-tailed starling is a winter visitor to peninsular India, the closely related resident breeding population with a white head is now treated as a full species, the Malabar starling (Sturnia blythii).

== Taxonomy ==
The chestnut-tailed starling was formally described in 1789 by the German naturalist Johann Friedrich Gmelin in his revised and expanded edition of Carl Linnaeus's Systema Naturae. He placed it with the thrushes in the genus Turdus and coined the binomial name Turdus malabaricus. Gmelin based his account on the "Le Martin Vieillard de la côte de Malabar" that had been described in 1782 by the French naturalist Pierre Sonnerat in his book Voyage aux Indes orientales et à la Chine.

The chestnut-tailed starling was formerly placed in the genus Sturnus. A molecular phylogenetic study published in 2008 found that the genus was polyphyletic. In the reorganization to create monotypic genera, the chestnut-tailed starling was one of five starlings moved to the resurrected genus Sturnia that had been introduced in 1837 by René Lesson.

Two subspecies are recognised:

- S. m. malabarica (Gmelin, JF, 1789) – India (except southwest, northeast), south Nepal and Bangladesh
- S. m. nemoricola Jerdon, 1862 – south Assam (northeast India) and Myanmar to north, central Indochina

Both the nominate subspecies and nemoricola are known to perform some poorly understood movements (e.g., S. m. malabarica has been recorded from Pakistan and in central and southern India).

The taxon blythii is now usually (e.g. Rasmussen & Anderton, 2005) considered a valid species, the Malabar starling or white-headed myna (Sturnia blythii), instead of a subspecies of Sturnia malabarica. As S. m. malabarica only visits the range of blythii during the non-breeding period (winter), the two are not known to interbreed. However, a molecular study found the genetic divergence between S. blythii not significantly greater (between 0.2% and 0.8%) than between the sisters S. m. malabarica of northern India and S. m. nemoricola of Burma and Vietnam.

== Description ==
The adults have a total length of approximately 20 cm (7.9 in). They have grey upperparts and blackish remiges, but the colour of the remaining plumage depends on the subspecies. In the nominate subspecies and blythii, the underparts (incl. undertail) are rufous, but in nemoricola the underparts are whitish tinged rufous, especially on the flanks and crissum (the undertail coverts surrounding the cloaca). The nominate and nemoricola have a light grey head with whitish streaking (especially on crown and collar region). Both subspecies have white irises and a yellow bill with a pale blue base. The sexes are similar, but juveniles have whitish underparts and just chestnut tips to the tail feathers.

== Behaviour ==
The chestnut-tailed starling's nest is typically found in open woodland and cultivation, and it builds a nest in an old barbet or woodpecker hole in a tree-trunk, 3–12 m (9.8–39.4 ft) up. The normal clutch is 3-5 eggs, pale blue, unmarked. The nesting season is usually March to June.

Like most starlings, it is fairly omnivorous, eating fruit, nectar and insects. They fly in tight flocks and often rapidly change directions with great synchrony.
