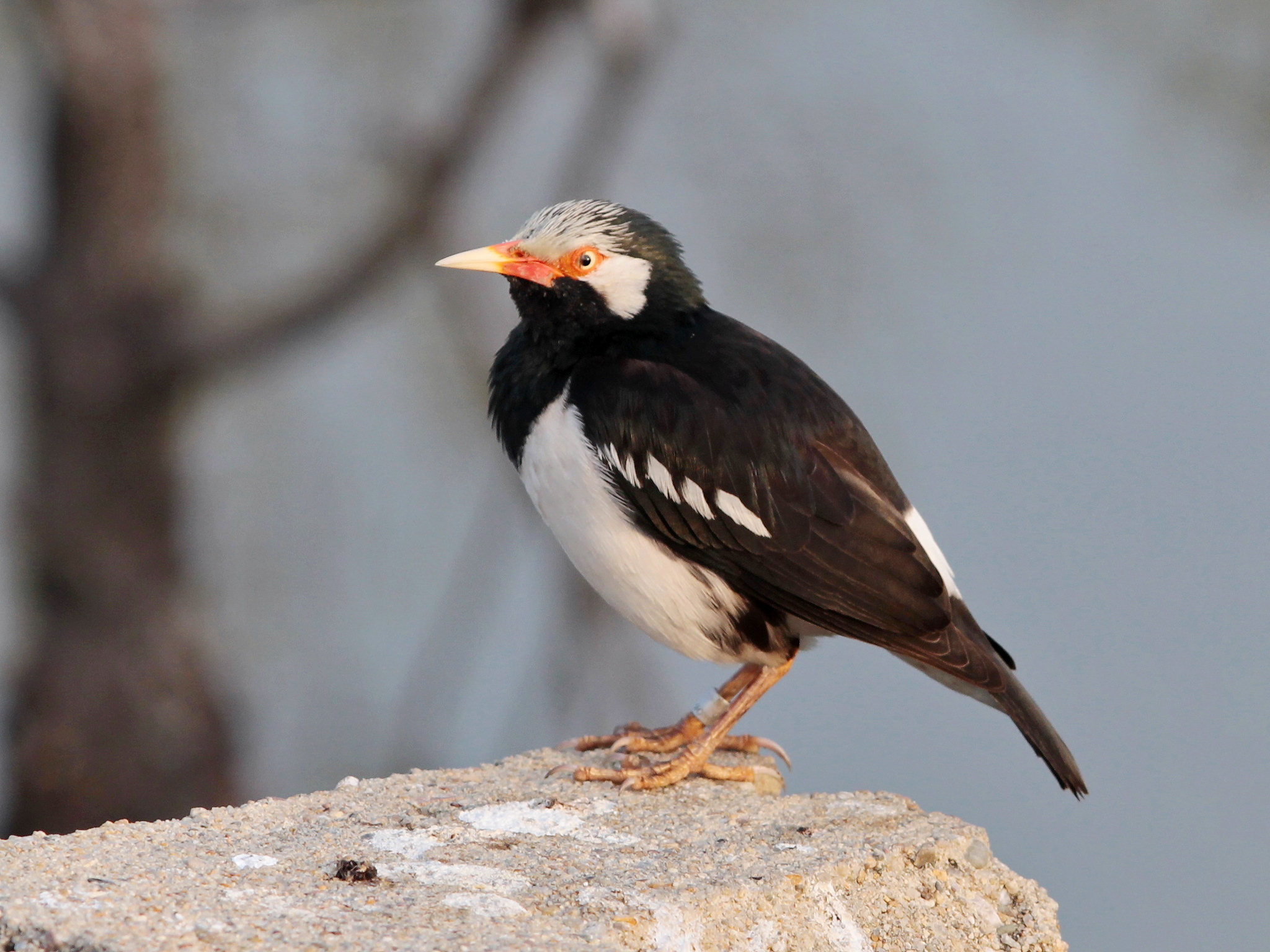

Conservation status
- Least Concern (IUCN 3.1)

Scientific classification
- Kingdom: Animalia
- Phylum: Chordata
- Class: Aves
- Order: Passeriformes
- Family: Sturnidae
- Genus: Gracupica
- Species: G. floweri

Binomial name
- Gracupica floweri (Sharpe, 1897)

= Siamese pied myna =

Species of bird

The Siamese pied myna (Gracupica floweri) is a species of starling in the family Sturnidae. Its plumage is black and white, with a black collar. It is found in southern Myanmar to Thailand and Laos. It previously was considered a subspecies of the pied myna, which has now been split into three species. It can be distinguished from the Indian pied myna (G. contra) and Javan pied myna (G. jalla) by more extensive white streaking on its forehead from both and a wider extent of bare red-orange facial skin around the eye compared to G. contra, but much less compared to G. jalla.
