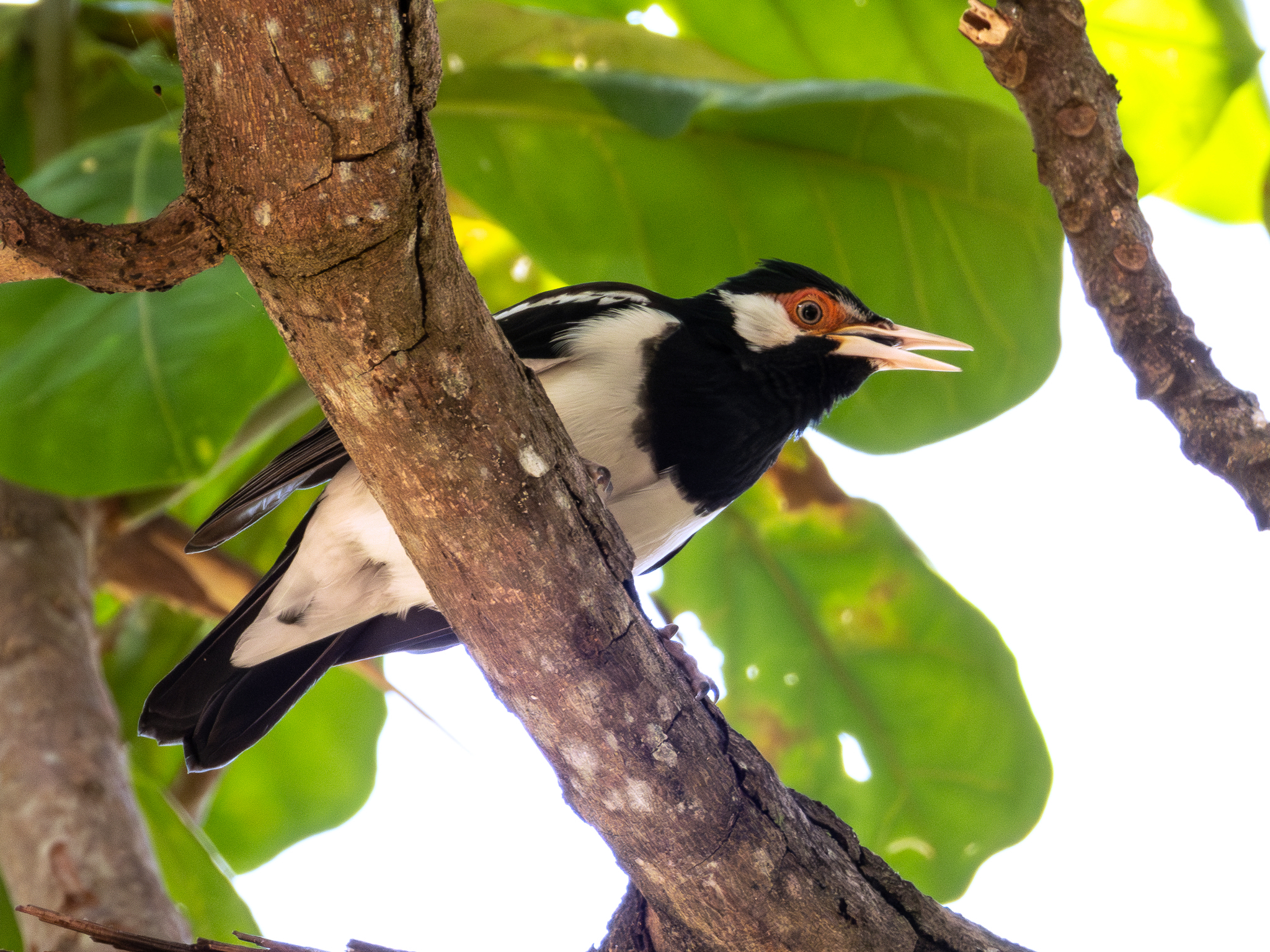
- At Bali Birding Tour National Park, Bali, Indonesia

Conservation status
- Critically Endangered (IUCN 3.1)

Scientific classification
- Kingdom: Animalia
- Phylum: Chordata
- Class: Aves
- Order: Passeriformes
- Family: Sturnidae
- Genus: Gracupica
- Species: G. jalla

Binomial name
- Gracupica jalla (Horsfield, 1821)

= Javan pied myna =

Species of bird

The Javan pied myna (Gracupica jalla) is a species of starling in the family Sturnidae. Its Indonesian name is jalak suren. Its plumage is black and white, with a black collar. It was found in most of Java and Bali (but has been potentially extirpated from there since the mid-2010s) and formerly in southern Sumatra (where it is known to have become extinct in the area since the 1990s). Due to mass collection for the illegal wildlife trade and heavy pesticide use in the agricultural lands it used for feeding, it is now feared to be extinct in the wild.

It previously was considered a subspecies of the pied myna, which has now been split into three species; it can be distinguished from the other species by the lack of reddish-orange coloration on its bill base and an extensive patch of red-orange bare skin around the eyes. Even in captivity, it is threatened by potential hybridization with the Siamese pied myna (G. floweri) that it was formerly thought conspecific with. Also threatening the species is advocacy work by the bird keepers' lobby, which successfully led the Ministry of Environment and Forestry to remove the species from the protected species list in 2018. It is necessary to conserve genetically pure captive individuals to breed and eventually reintroduce the species; one such population exists at Bali Bird Park.
