= Outline of Montserrat =

Overview of and topical guide to Montserrat

The Flag of Montserrat

The Coat of arms of Montserrat

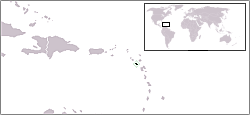
The location of Montserrat

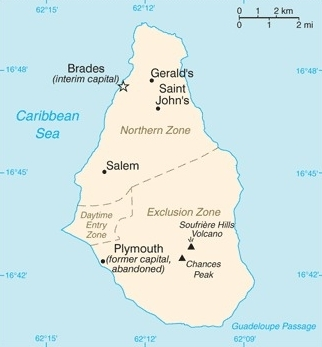
An enlargeable map of Montserrat

The following outline is provided as an overview of and topical guide to Montserrat:

Montserrat – British overseas territory located in the Leeward Islands of the Lesser Antilles archipelago in the Caribbean Sea. The Island of Montserrat is approximately 16 km (9.9 mi) long and 11 km (6.8 mi) wide with 40 kilometres (25 mi) of coastline. The island was given its name by Christopher Columbus on his second voyage to the New World in 1493, after its namesake located in Catalonia. Montserrat is often referred to as the Emerald Isle of the Caribbean, due both to its resemblance to coastal Ireland and to the Irish descent of most of its early European settlers.

Its Georgian era capital city of Plymouth was destroyed and two-thirds of the island's population forced to flee abroad by an eruption of the previously dormant Soufriere Hills volcano that began on July 18, 1995. The eruption continues today on a much reduced scale, the damage being confined to the areas around Plymouth including its docking facilities and the former W.H. Bramble Airport. An exclusion zone extending from the south coast of the island north to parts of the Belham Valley has been closed because of an increase in the size of the existing volcanic dome. This zone includes St. George's Hill which provided visitors with a view of the volcano and the destruction it has wrought upon the capital. A new airport at Gerald's in the northern part of the island opened in 2005. The village of Brades currently serves as the de facto centre of government.

== General reference ==
- Pronunciation:
- Common English country name: Montserrat
- Official English country name: The British Overseas Territory of Montserrat
- Common endonym(s):
- Official endonym(s):
- Adjectival(s): Montserratian
- Demonym(s):
- Etymology: Name of Montserrat
- ISO country codes: MS, MSR, 500
- ISO region codes: See ISO 3166-2:MS
- Internet country code top-level domain: .ms

== Geography of Montserrat ==
Geography of Montserrat

- Montserrat is: an island, and a British overseas territory
- Location:
  - Northern Hemisphere and Western Hemisphere
    - North America (though not on the mainland)
  - Atlantic Ocean
    - North Atlantic
      - Caribbean
        - Antilles
          - Lesser Antilles
            - Leeward Islands
  - Time zone: Eastern Caribbean Time (UTC-04)
  - Extreme points of Montserrat
    - High: Chances Peak in the Soufriere Hills volcanic complex 915 m (3,002 ft)
    - Low: Caribbean Sea 0 m
  - Land boundaries: none
  - Coastline: Caribbean Sea 40 km
- Population of Montserrat: 5,900 - 216th most populous country
- Area of Montserrat: 102 km^{2}
- Atlas of Montserrat

=== Environment of Montserrat ===
- Climate of Montserrat
- Renewable energy in Montserrat
- Geology of Montserrat
- Protected areas of Montserrat
  - Biosphere reserves in Montserrat
  - National parks of Montserrat
- Wildlife of Montserrat
  - Fauna of Montserrat
    - Birds of Montserrat
    - Mammals of Montserrat

==== Natural geographic features of Montserrat ====
- Fjords of Montserrat
- Glaciers of Montserrat
- Islands of Montserrat
- Lakes of Montserrat
- Mountains of Montserrat
  - Volcanoes in Montserrat
- Rivers of Montserrat
  - Waterfalls of Montserrat
- Valleys of Montserrat
- World Heritage Sites in Montserrat: None

=== Regions of Montserrat ===
Regions of Montserrat

==== Ecoregions of Montserrat ====
List of ecoregions in Montserrat

- Ecoregions in Montserrat

==== Administrative divisions of Montserrat ====
Administrative divisions of Montserrat

- Parishes of Montserrat

===== Municipalities of Montserrat =====
- Capital of Montserrat: Brades
- Cities of Montserrat

=== Demography of Montserrat ===
Demographics of Montserrat

== Government and politics of Montserrat ==
Politics of Montserrat

- Form of government: parliamentary representative democratic dependency
- Capital of Montserrat: Brades
- Elections in Montserrat
- Political parties in Montserrat

=== Branches of the government of Montserrat ===
Government of Montserrat

==== Executive branch of the government of Montserrat ====
- Head of state: Monarch of the United Kingdom, King Charles III
  - Monarch's representative: Governor of Montserrat, Harriet Cross
- Head of government: Premier of Montserrat, Reuben Meade
- Cabinet of Montserrat

==== Legislative branch of the government of Montserrat ====
- Parliament of Montserrat (bicameral)
  - Upper house: Senate of Montserrat
  - Lower house: House of Commons of Montserrat

==== Judicial branch of the government of Montserrat ====
Court system of Montserrat

- Supreme Court of Montserrat

=== Foreign relations of Montserrat ===
Foreign relations of Montserrat

- Diplomatic missions in Montserrat
- Diplomatic missions of Montserrat
- Montserrat-United Kingdom relations

==== International organization membership ====
Montserrat is a member of:

- Caribbean Community and Common Market (Caricom)
- Caribbean Development Bank (CDB)
- International Criminal Police Organization (Interpol) (subbureau)
- Organization of Eastern Caribbean States (OECS)
- Universal Postal Union (UPU)
- World Federation of Trade Unions (WFTU)

=== Law and order in Montserrat ===
Law of Montserrat

- Constitution of Montserrat
- Crime in Montserrat
- Human rights in Montserrat
  - LGBT rights in Montserrat
  - Freedom of religion in Montserrat
- Law enforcement in Montserrat

=== Military of Montserrat ===
Military of Montserrat

- Command
  - Commander-in-chief:
    - Ministry of Defence of Montserrat
- Forces
  - Army of Montserrat
  - Navy of Montserrat
  - Air Force of Montserrat
  - Special forces of Montserrat
- Military history of Montserrat
- Military ranks of Montserrat

=== Local government in Montserrat ===
Local government in Montserrat

== History of Montserrat ==
History of Montserrat

- Timeline of the history of Montserrat
- Current events of Montserrat
- Military history of Montserrat

== Culture of Montserrat ==
Culture of Montserrat

- Architecture of Montserrat
- Cuisine of Montserrat
- Festivals in Montserrat
- Languages of Montserrat
- Media in Montserrat
- National symbols of Montserrat
  - Coat of arms of Montserrat
  - Flag of Montserrat
  - National anthem of Montserrat
- People of Montserrat
- Public holidays in Montserrat
- Records of Montserrat
- Religion in Montserrat
  - Christianity in Montserrat
  - Hinduism in Montserrat
  - Islam in Montserrat
  - Judaism in Montserrat
  - Sikhism in Montserrat
- World Heritage Sites in Montserrat: None

=== Art in Montserrat ===
- Art in Montserrat
- Cinema of Montserrat
- Literature of Montserrat
- Music of Montserrat
- Television in Montserrat
- Theatre in Montserrat

=== Sports in Montserrat ===
Sports in Montserrat

- Football in Montserrat
- Montserrat at the Olympics

== Economy and infrastructure of Montserrat ==
Economy of Montserrat

- Economic rank, by nominal GDP (2007): 189th (one hundred and eighty ninth)
- Agriculture in Montserrat
- Banking in Montserrat
  - National Bank of Montserrat
- Communications in Montserrat
  - Internet in Montserrat
- Companies of Montserrat
- Currency of Montserrat: Dollar
  - ISO 4217: XCD
- Energy in Montserrat
  - Energy policy of Montserrat
  - Oil industry in Montserrat
- Mining in Montserrat
- Tourism in Montserrat
- Transport in Montserrat
- Montserrat Stock Exchange

== Education in Montserrat ==
Education in Montserrat

== Infrastructure of Montserrat ==
- Health care in Montserrat
- Transportation in Montserrat
  - Airports in Montserrat
  - Rail transport in Montserrat
  - Roads in Montserrat
- Water supply and sanitation in Montserrat

== See also ==
Montserrat

- Index of Montserrat-related articles
- List of international rankings
- List of Montserrat-related topics
- Outline of geography
- Outline of North America
- Outline of the Caribbean
- Outline of the United Kingdom
