= Index of Montserrat-related articles =

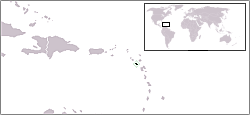
The location of the British Overseas Territory of Montserrat

The following is an alphabetical list of topics related to the British Overseas Territory of Montserrat.

== 0–9 ==
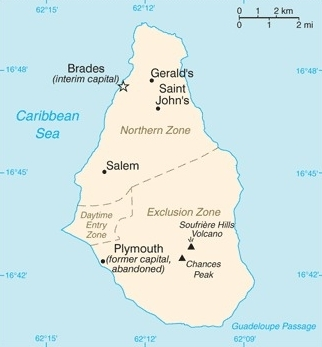
A map of Montserrat

- .ms – Internet country code top-level domain for Montserrat

== A ==
- Administrative divisions of Montserrat
- Airports in Montserrat
- Americas
  - North America
    - North Atlantic Ocean
      - West Indies
        - Caribbean Sea
          - Antilles
            - Lesser Antilles
              - Islands of Montserrat
- Anglo-America
- Antilles
- Army of Montserrat
- Atlas of Montserrat

== B ==
- Birds of Montserrat
- Brades – Capital of Montserrat
- British Overseas Territory of Montserrat

== C ==
- Capital of Montserrat: Brades
- Caribbean
- Caribbean Community (CARICOM)
- Caribbean Sea
- Categories:
  - Category:Montserrat
    - Category:Buildings and structures in Montserrat
    - Category:Communications in Montserrat
    - Category:Economy of Montserrat
    - The Coat of arms of Montserrat
    - Category:Education in Montserrat
    - Category:Environment of Montserrat
    - Category:Geography of Montserrat
    - Category:Government of Montserrat
    - Category:Health in Montserrat
    - Category:History of Montserrat
    - Category:Montserrat stubs
    - Category:Montserratian culture
    - Category:Montserratian people
    - Category:Montserrat-related lists
    - Category:Politics of Montserrat
    - Category:Society of Montserrat
    - Category:Sport in Montserrat
    - Category:Transport in Montserrat
  - commons:Category:Montserrat
- Climate of Montserrat
- Coat of arms of Montserrat
- Commonwealth of Nations
- Communications in Montserrat
- Cricket in the West Indies

== D ==
- Demographics of Montserrat

== E ==
- Economy of Montserrat
- Education in Montserrat
- Elberton, Montserrat
- Elections in Montserrat
- English colonization of the Americas
- English language
- Olaudah Equiano, famous resident, c. 1760s.

== F ==
The Flag of Montserrat

- Flag of Montserrat

== G ==
- Geography of Montserrat
- Government of Montserrat
- Gross domestic product

== H ==
- History of Montserrat

== I ==
- International Organization for Standardization (ISO)
  - ISO 3166-1 alpha-2 country code for Montserrat: MS
  - ISO 3166-1 alpha-3 country code for Montserrat: MSR
- Internet in Montserrat
- Islands of Montserrat:
  - Montserrat island
  - Goat Islet
  - Little Redonda

== L ==
- Leeward Islands
- Lesser Antilles
- Lists related to Montserrat:
  - List of airports in Montserrat
  - List of birds of Montserrat
  - List of countries by GDP (nominal)
  - List of islands of Montserrat
  - List of mammals in Montserrat
  - List of Montserrat-related topics
  - List of places in Montserrat
  - List of political parties in Montserrat
  - List of rivers of Montserrat
  - List of volcanoes in Montserrat
  - Topic outline of Montserrat

== M ==
- Mammals of Montserrat
- Military of Montserrat
- Montserrat
- Montserratian British people - there are more Montserratians in the UK than Montserrat
- Music of Montserrat

== N ==
- North America
- Northern Hemisphere

== O ==
- Organisation of Eastern Caribbean States (OECS)

== P ==
- Parishes of Montserrat
- Political parties in Montserrat
- Politics of Montserrat

== R ==
- Radio Antilles
- Rivers of Montserrat

== S ==
- The Scout Association of Montserrat
- Soufrière Hills
- St. Patrick's Church, Lookout
- Joseph Sturge
- Edmund Sturge

== T ==
- Topic outline of Montserrat
- Transport in Montserrat

== U ==
- United Kingdom of Great Britain and Northern Ireland

== V ==
- Volcanoes of Montserrat

== W ==
- Weekes, Montserrat
- Western Hemisphere
- Wikimedia Atlas of Montserrat
- Wikipedia:WikiProject Topic outline/Drafts/Topic outline of Montserrat

== See also ==
- List of Caribbean-related topics
- List of international rankings
- Lists of country-related topics
- Topic outline of geography
- Topic outline of Montserrat
- Topic outline of North America
