= Economy of Montserrat =

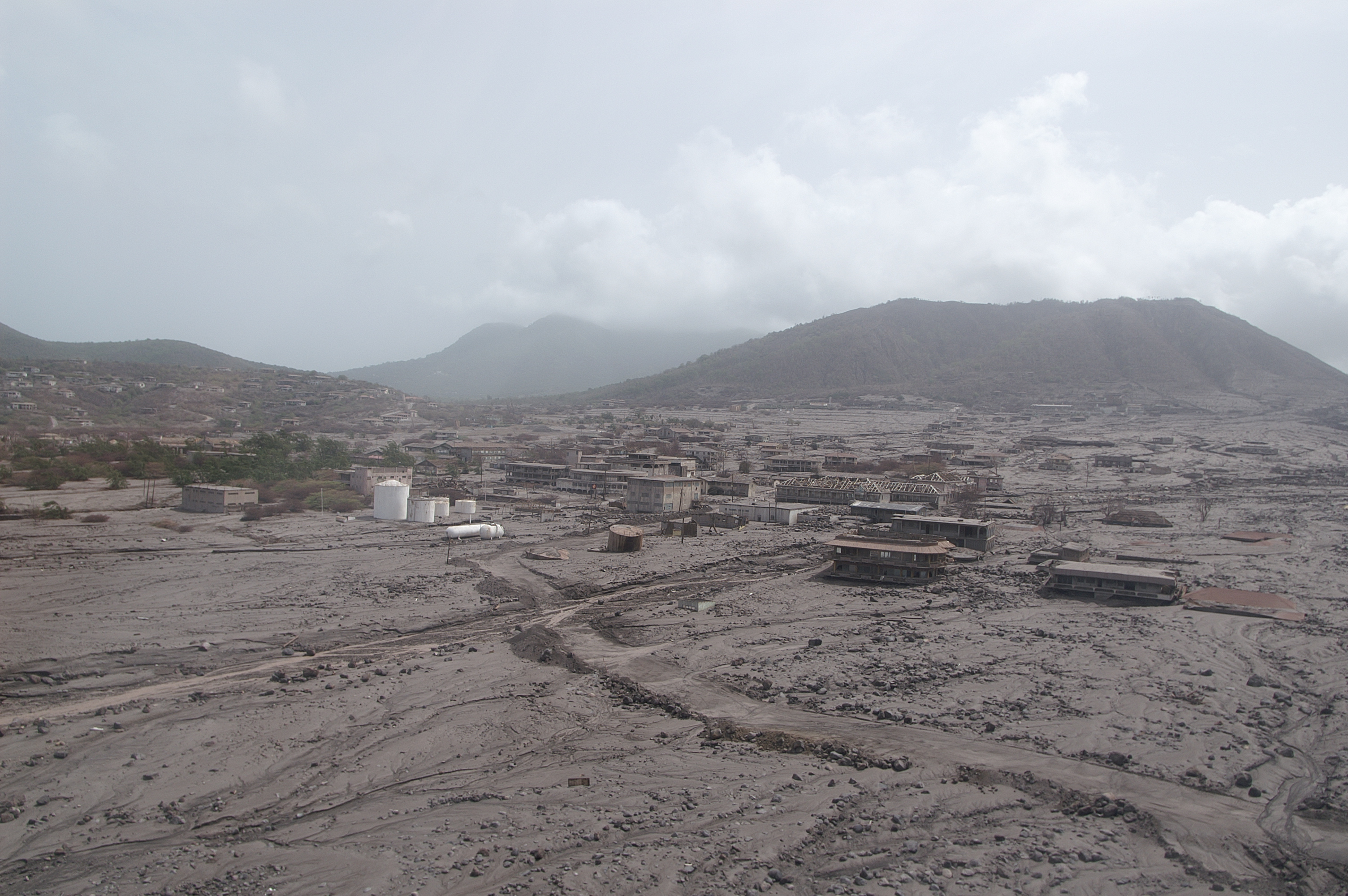
Plymouth, the capital, was abandoned in 1997 following the eruption of Soufrière Hills

The economy of Montserrat is an economical system which was severely disrupted by volcanic activity which began in July 1995. Prior to this date, the small island country of 12,000 had an export economy based on agriculture, clothing, electronic parts and plants, with a per capita gross national product of US$3,000 to 8,000.

Montserrat had an international reputation as a tourist getaway, and the record producer George Martin established an important recording studio there, Associated Independent Recording. Destroyed by Hurricane Hugo in 1989, the studio was never reestablished; however, Martin subsequently helped found the Montserrat Cultural Centre, which was opened in 2007. Some of the funds were raised in a London concert called "Music for Montserrat" (September 15, 1997).

== Collapse ==
A catastrophic eruption of Soufrière Hills in June 1997 closed the W. H. Bramble Airport and seaport at Plymouth, causing further economic and social dislocation. Two-thirds of the inhabitants fled the island. Some began to return in 1998, but lack of housing limited the number.

The agriculture sector continued to be affected by the lack of suitable land for farming and the destruction of crops. Prospects for the economy depend largely on developments in relation to the volcano and on public sector construction activity. The UK launched a three-year $122.8 million aid program to help reconstruct the economy. Half of the island was expected to remain uninhabitable for another decade.

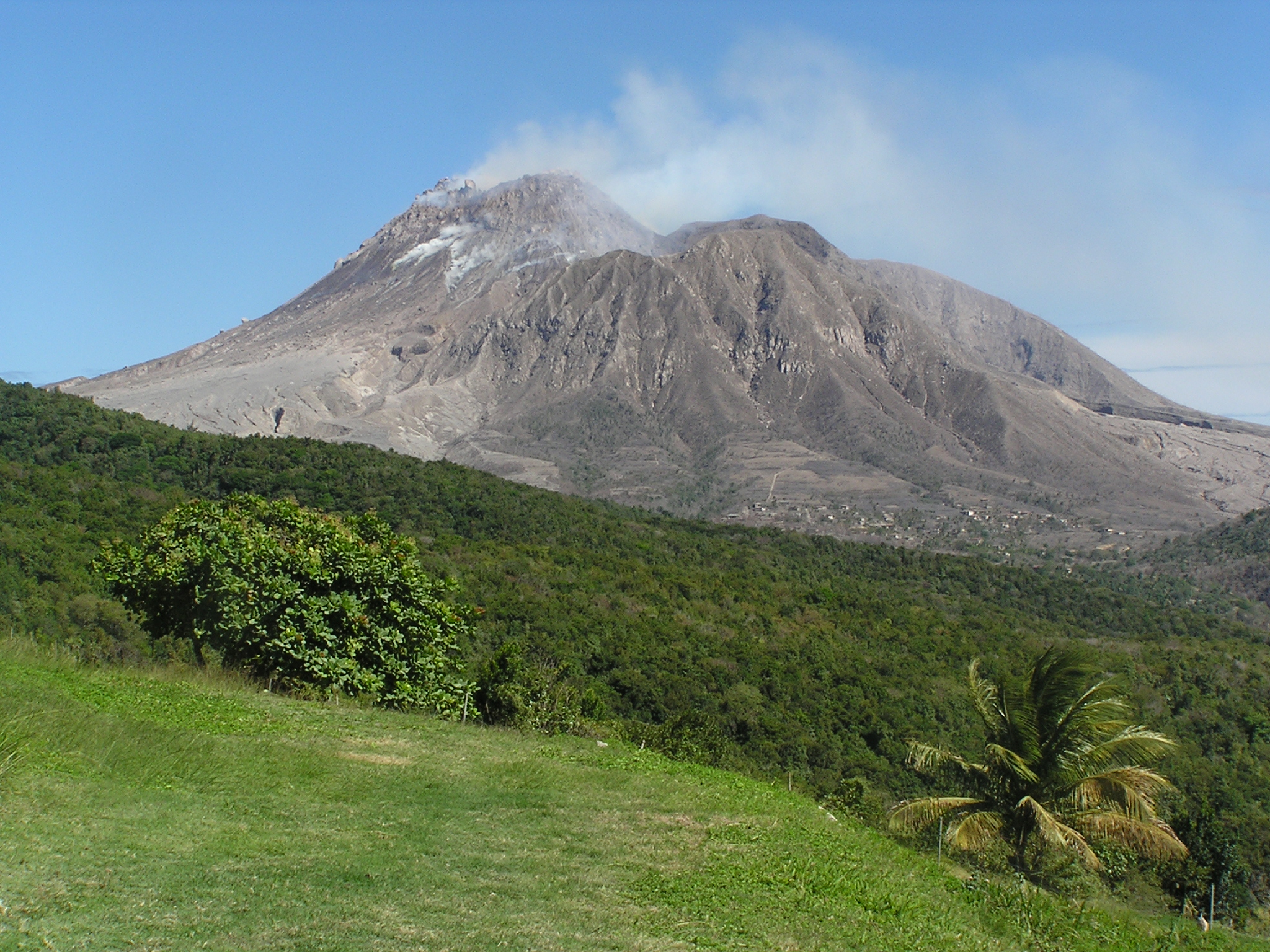
Soufrière Hills continues to play a detrimental role in both agricultural and economic activity on Montserrat.

Today, Montserrat's main economic activity is in construction and government services which together accounted for about 50 percent of GDP in 2000 when it was EC$76 million. In contrast, banking and insurance together accounted for less than 10 percent of GDP. The unemployment rate in 1998 was estimated at 6 percent. Montserrat's domestic financial sector is very small and has seen a reduction in offshore finance in recent years with only 11 offshore banks remaining. Real GDP declined from EC$122 million in 1995 to about EC$60 million in 1999, with the rate of decline peaking at -21.5 percent for 1996. The decline in economic activity reflected in large part the completion of major projects in both the private and public sectors. However, the rate of decline slowed markedly since 2000 and 2001, when GDP contracted by less than 3 percent. In 2002, the GDP growth rate reverted to a positive 4.6 percent reversing the declining trend over the past six years and maybe more.

Year	Real GDP (factor cost)	% Change
1996	95.9	-21.5
1997	76.7	-20.0
1998	68.9	-8.6
1999	60.3	-12.5
2000	58.6	-2.8
2001	56.9	-2.9
2002	59.5	-4.6
2002	79.9 (2000 constant prices)	+3.3
2003	78.9	-0.9
2004	82.4	+4.5
2005	83.7	+1.5

== New Town ==
The Montserrat Development Corporation was an entity founded by the Government of Montserrat and the Department for International Development in 2008. The company's primary mandate was to help foster private sector investment and development on the island. The company had announced plans to develop the new town of Little Bay on the northwest coast of Montserrat between Brades and Davy Hill, however an internal audit of the company in 2015 led to the company's dissolution. The audit revealed that the company was not being prudent with the government's funds.

Slated for completion by 2020, the new town will be the new focus of tourism, trade and housing and will also house the seat of government.

== Sectors ==
=== Agriculture ===
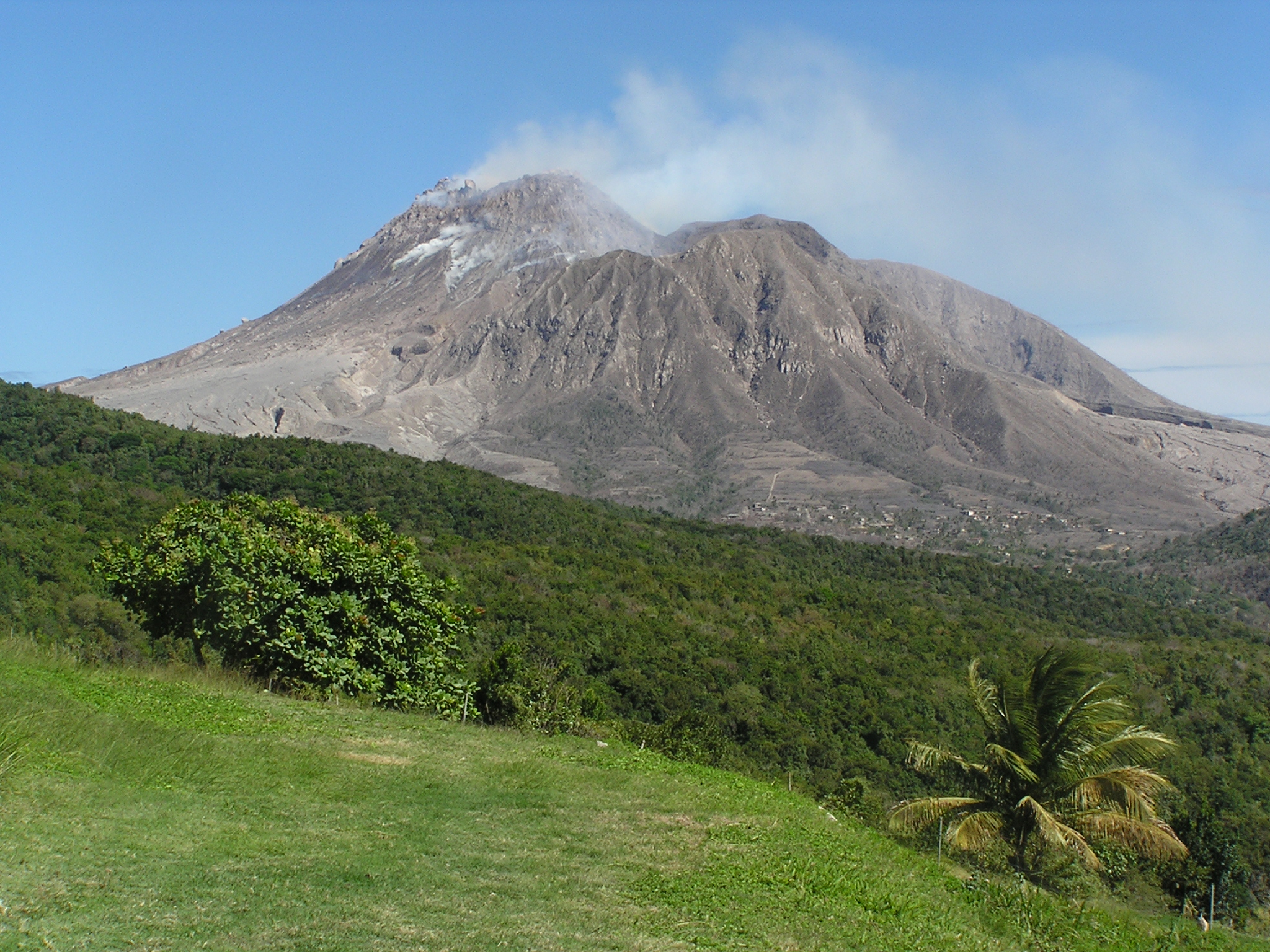
Soufrière Hills plays a detrimental role in both agricultural and economic activity on Montserrat.

Agriculture in Montserrat, a British Overseas Territory, is a small industry that is heavily influenced by the volcanic activity of the Soufrière Hills. Historically a major producer of sugar and tobacco, the eruptions of the Soufrière Hills between 1995 and 1997 severely damaged infrastructure across a large part of the island. Much of the arable land was destroyed during eruptions or now falls within an "exclusion zone", leaving only limited sections on the northern region of the island usable for cultivation.

Prior to the eruption, the northern part of Montserrat, where the population was relocated following the eruptions, has been characterized as having poorly developed soils, little rainfall, and poor agriculture.

Agriculture plays little role in the island's economy, as most of the economic activity since the eruptions is generated by service jobs (tourism, government) and construction. Regardless, the government of Montserrat has committed to investing in new technology to revive the agricultural industry of the island; so that it is more self-sustainable and less reliant on food imports.

=== Telecommunications ===
Montserrat possesses a number of telecommunications systems, including mobile and main line telephone, radio and television. The country code for Montserrat in the Domain Name System of the Internet is ".ms". Telephony uses the area code 664.

According to a July 2016 estimate by the CIA, Montserrat's fully digitalized telephone service had 3,000 subscribers while an estimated 5,000 mobile handsets were in use. An estimated 2,860 users have internet access.

There are 17 internet service providers.

Montserrat possesses an AM radio station, and 2 FM stations. These serve 7,000 radios (by 1997 figures). There is one television broadcast station, which in 1997 was serving 3,000 televisions; the Peoples Television (PTV) is a free service providing news, documentaries, commercials and entertainment. Cable and satellite television service is also available.

=== Education ===
Education in Montserrat is compulsory for children between the ages of 5 and 14, and free up to the age of 17. The Government of Montserrat developed an Education in the Country Policy Plan for 1998–2002 in conjunction with the United Kingdom. Under this plan, the government is supporting initiatives in the areas of curriculum development, student assessment and evaluation, professional development for teachers, post-secondary education expansion, and educational infrastructure and information technology.

The educational system is similar to that of England. In 1990 all primary school-aged residents were enrolled in school.
