= List of rivers of the United Kingdom =

For details of rivers of the United Kingdom, see

- List of rivers of England
- List of rivers of Scotland
- List of rivers of Wales
- Northern Ireland: see List of rivers of Ireland and Rivers of Ireland
- Longest rivers of the United Kingdom

== Overseas territories ==
- Rivers of the Falkland Islands
- List of rivers of Montserrat

== Crown Dependencies ==
- List of rivers of the Isle of Man
