= Wildlife of Montserrat =

For information on the wildlife of Montserrat, see:

- List of birds of Montserrat
- List of mammals of Montserrat
- List of amphibians and reptiles of Montserrat
