= Geology of Montserrat =

The geology of Montserrat formed from the Pliocene into recent times with five major and three parasitic volcanoes. For the most part, the volcanoes only erupted andesite, pyroclastic flows and dome lavas and the Montserrat series is dominantly calc-alkaline. The only exception is South Soufriere Hill with basalt lava flows and pyroclastic flows.

Montserrat's volcanic centres become progressively younger from north to south, consisting of the Silver Hills, Centre Hills, Soufrière Hills, and South Soufrière Hills. The Silver Hills and Centre Hills are older volcanic complexes, while the Soufrière Hills represents the island's youngest and currently active volcanic centre.

== See also ==
- Soufrière Hills Volcano
