= Telecommunications in Montserrat =

Montserrat possesses a number of telecommunications systems, including mobile and main line telephone, radio and television. The country code for Montserrat in the Domain Name System of the Internet is ".ms". Telephony uses the area code 664.

According to a July 2016 estimate by the CIA, Montserrat's fully digitalized telephone service had 3,000 subscribers while an estimated 5,000 mobile handsets were in use. An estimated 2,860 users have internet access.

There are 17 internet service providers.

Montserrat possesses an AM radio station, and 2 FM stations. These serve 7,000 radios (by 1997 figures). There is one television broadcast station, which in 1997 was serving 3,000 televisions; the Peoples Television (PTV) is a free service providing news, documentaries, commercials and entertainment. Cable and satellite television service is also available.
