= Agriculture in Montserrat =

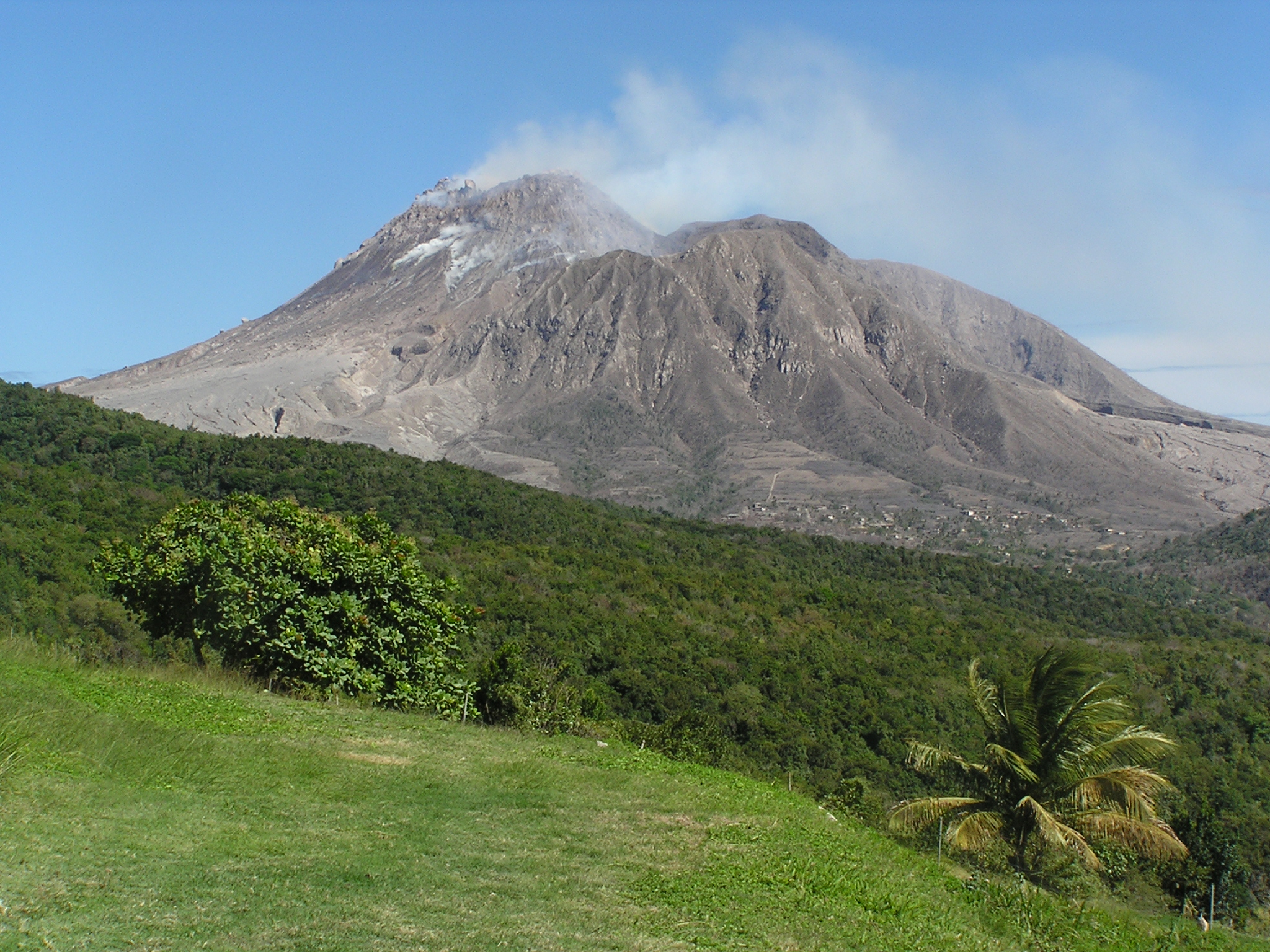
Soufrière Hills plays a detrimental role in both agricultural and economic activity on Montserrat.

Agriculture in Montserrat, a British Overseas Territory, is a small industry that is heavily influenced by the volcanic activity of the Soufrière Hills. Historically a major producer of sugar and tobacco, the eruptions of the Soufrière Hills between 1995 and 1997 severely damaged infrastructure across a large part of the island. Much of the arable land was destroyed during eruptions or now falls within an "exclusion zone", leaving only limited sections on the northern region of the island usable for cultivation.

Prior to the eruption, the northern part of Montserrat, where the population was relocated following the eruptions, has been characterized as having poorly developed soils, little rainfall, and poor agriculture.

Agriculture plays little role in the island's economy, as most of the economic activity since the eruptions is generated by service jobs (tourism, government) and construction. Regardless, the government of Montserrat has committed to investing in new technology to revive the agricultural industry of the island; so that it is more self-sustainable and less reliant on food imports.
