= Geography of Montserrat =

Montserrat
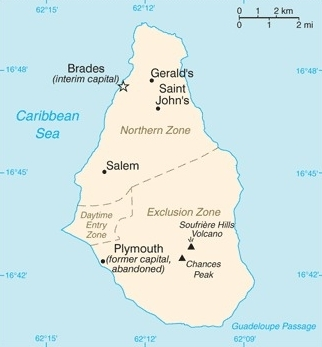
- Map of Montserrat

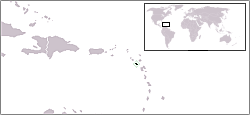

Geography
- Location: Caribbean Sea
- Coordinates: 16°45′N 62°12′W
- Archipelago: Leeward Islands
- Area: 102 km^{2} (39 sq mi)
- Coastline: 39.8 km (24.73 mi)
- Highest elevation: 914.2 m (2999.3 ft)
- Highest point: Chances Peak (in the Soufrière Hills)

Administration
- United Kingdom
- British Overseas Territory: Montserrat
- Largest settlement: Brades (pop. 1,000)

Demographics
- Population: 4,488
- Pop. density: 44.88/km^{2} (116.24/sq mi)

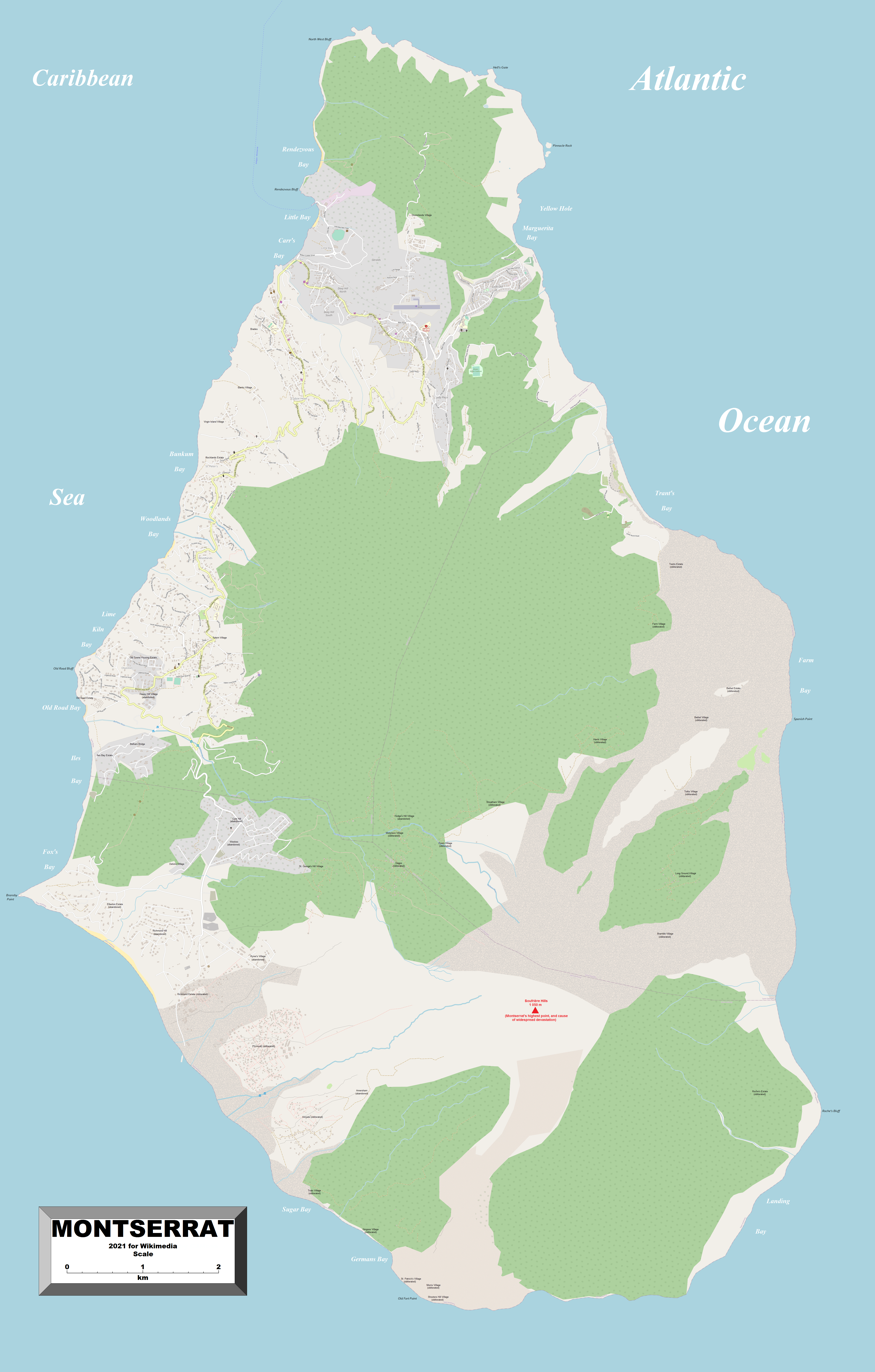
Map of Montserrat

Montserrat is a volcanic island in the Caribbean Sea. Part of the Leeward Islands, it is a British Overseas Territory. Covering an area of 102 km^{2} (39 sq mi), it is located to the northwest of Guadeloupe, southwest of Antigua and southeast of Nevis. The island’s terrain is mostly mountainous, dominated by the active Soufrière Hills volcano rising to about 1,050 m (3,440 ft). The island has a tropical climate with minimal temperature variations and frequently experiences hurricanes from June to November. Due to repeated volcanic activity, more than half of the island is now permanently uninhabitable, primarily in the south, leaving only the northern third settled.

== Location ==
Montserrat is a volcanic island in the Leeward Islands of the Caribbean, and forms a part of the British Overseas Territory. Covering an area of 102 km^{2} (39 sq mi), the island has a 40 km (25 mi) long coastline. About 16 km (9.9 mi) long and 11 km (6.8 mi) wide, it is situated approximately 40 km (25 mi) southwest of Antigua, 56 km (35 mi) northwest of Guadeloupe, and southeast of Nevis.

== Topography ==
The island’s terrain is mostly mountainous, dominated by the active Soufrière Hills volcano. It rises to about 1,050 m (3,440 ft) post the eruption and subsequent dome formation in 1995. The island features two other major volcanic systems Silver Hills, and Centre Hills. The mostly mountainous interior is flanked by coastal lowlands. The Soufrière Hills volcano caused widespread devastation, including the destruction of the capital and formerly largest settlement on the island, Plymouth in 1995, and made the southern part of the island uninhabitable. Human settlement is constrained to the northern one-third of the island.

About 30% of the land supported agriculture, and 25% is covered with forests. The island vegetation ranges from mangroves and dry scrub in coastal plains to evergreen and montane forests in upland areas. The island has no major rivers or lakes, and water runoff occurs through seasonal ravines from highlands to the sea.

== Climate ==
Montserrat features tropical rainforest climate (Af in Köppen classification) with consistently warm temperatures. Annual rainfall varies from 1,016 mm (40.0 in) at lower altitudes to over 2,540 mm (100 in) at higher altitudes. The island is prone to frequent natural hazards such as hurricanes, and occasional earthquakes.

Climate data for Plymouth
Month	Jan	Feb	Mar	Apr	May	Jun	Jul	Aug	Sep	Oct	Nov	Dec	Year
Record high °C (°F)	32 (90)	33 (91)	34 (93)	34 (93)	36 (97)	37 (99)	37 (99)	37 (99)	36 (97)	34 (93)	37 (99)	33 (91)	37 (99)
Mean daily maximum °C (°F)	29 (84)	30 (86)	31 (88)	31 (88)	32 (90)	32 (90)	33 (91)	33 (91)	32 (90)	31 (88)	30 (86)	29 (84)	31 (88)
Mean daily minimum °C (°F)	23 (73)	23 (73)	24 (75)	24 (75)	24 (75)	25 (77)	25 (77)	25 (77)	24 (75)	24 (75)	24 (75)	23 (73)	24 (75)
Record low °C (°F)	17 (63)	18 (64)	18 (64)	18 (64)	19 (66)	21 (70)	22 (72)	22 (72)	21 (70)	19 (66)	19 (66)	18 (64)	17 (63)
Average precipitation mm (inches)	122 (4.8)	86 (3.4)	112 (4.4)	89 (3.5)	97 (3.8)	112 (4.4)	155 (6.1)	183 (7.2)	168 (6.6)	196 (7.7)	180 (7.1)	140 (5.5)	1,640 (64.6)
Source: BBC Weather
