= List of volcanoes in Montserrat =

This is a list of active and extinct volcanoes in Montserrat.

Name	Elevation		Location coordinates	Last eruption
Name	metres	feet	Location coordinates	Last eruption
Centre Hills	741	2,431	16.759°N 62.196°W	0.95-0.55 million years ago
Silver Hills	403	1,322	16.81°N 62.194°W	2.58-1.16 million years ago
Soufrière Hills	915	3,002	16.71°N 62.18°W	2013 CE
South Soufrière Hills	?	?	16.7°N 62.166667°W	1.47–1.27 million years ago

== See also ==
- Volcanoes of the Caribbean
- Lists of volcanoes
- List of mountains and hills in the Netherlands
