= People's Television (Montserrat) =

Television channel in Montserrat

Brades; Montserrat
- Channels: Digital: 7
- Branding: PTV

Ownership
- Owner: Edge Enterprises Limited

History
- Founded: 1991

People's Television (PTV) is a terrestrial television channel in the British overseas territory of Montserrat.

== History and programming ==
It started broadcasting in 1991 and produces a variety of local content, from programmes (including news bulletins) to commercials. It was not the first television station in Montserrat, as beginning in 1965 ZAL-TV (now ABS) installed a relay station on the island and in the 1980s, there was a station called Antilles TV. In the 2010s, it was linked to the British RAFFA association.

In 2011, the network held its own music competition, Montserrat Idol, which was modelled on American Idol, popular in Montserrat at the time.

As of 2012, Natalie Edgecombe was its manager. The network carried Caribbean Medical on Mondays in 2014, a syndicated programme.
