= Transport in Montserrat =

Railways: 0 km

Highways:
total: 269 km
paved: 203 km
unpaved: 66 km (1995)

Waterways: none

Ports and harbours: Plymouth (abandoned), Little Bay (anchorages and ferry landing), Carr's Bay

Merchant marine: none (2002 est.)

Airports: One, Gerald's Airport, opened on 11 July 2005, replacing W.H. Bramble Airport which was destroyed by volcanic eruption in 1997.

See also : Montserrat

== Sources ==
- CIA World Factbook
