= List of rivers of Montserrat =

This is a list of rivers of Montserrat. Rivers are listed in clockwise order, starting at the north end of the island.

- Farm River
  - Lee River
- Paradise River (formerly a tributary of the Farm river, course altered by pyroclastic flows)
- Tar River Valley (destroyed by pyroclastic flows)
- Hot River
- White River (destroyed by pyroclastic flows)
- Belham River a corruption of Balham, a plantation on the south of the river, previously The River estate. Known as Old Road River until at least 1900
  - Dyer’s River
- Nantes River known as Norris River until at least 1930
- Collins River
