= .ms =

Internet country-code top level domain for Montserrat

- Introduced: 6 March 1997
- TLD type: Country code top-level domain
- Status: Active
- Registry: MNI Networks Ltd
- Sponsor: Lubimal (MS) Ltd.
- Intended use: Entities connected with Montserrat
- Actual use: Used by a number of sites, a few of which are in Montserrat; occasionally used by Microsoft for link shortening
- Registration restrictions: None
- Structure: Registrations are available directly at second level
- Documents: Policies
- Dispute policies: Complaint Policy & Procedures; Complaint Resolution Service
- Registry website: mninet.ms nic.ms

.ms is the Internet country code top-level domain (ccTLD) for Montserrat, a British Overseas Territory.

== Usage examples ==
- Microsoft uses this as an abbreviation for projects such as ch9.ms, 1drv.ms for OneDrive, and for Defender for Cloud Apps. In particular, aka.ms is used extensively as a URL shortener for Microsoft's web sites, such as http://aka.ms/MFAsetup.
- Websites based in, or having to do with, the U.S. state of Mississippi also use the .ms domain as MS is the ISO 3166-2:US code and official United States Postal Service abbreviation for the state. Technically, Mississippi is assigned .ms.us under the .us locality namespace.
- Some companies based in the Brazilian state of Mato Grosso do Sul (officially abbreviated as MS) use the .ms TLD
- Some companies and organisations in the German city Münster in Westphalia use the TLD as well since MS is the official vehicle license plate code for the city.
- The New York Times uses .ms as a top level domain name for permalinks referring to New York Times addresses. For example, nyti.ms reaches The New York Times homepage.
- The Hillary Clinton 2016 presidential campaign used the domain name "HRC.ms" as a URL shortener.
- The family of F1 driver Michael Schumacher used the domain name keepfighting.ms for his foundation, established after his skiing accident in Méribel on 29 December 2013
- A Dutch foundation for the cure of multiple sclerosis (MS) uses arenamoves.ms.
- The Dutch organisation openbsd.amsterdam uses obsda.ms for its short code link.

== Second-level domain names ==
- com.ms
- edu.ms
- gov.ms
- net.ms
- org.ms
