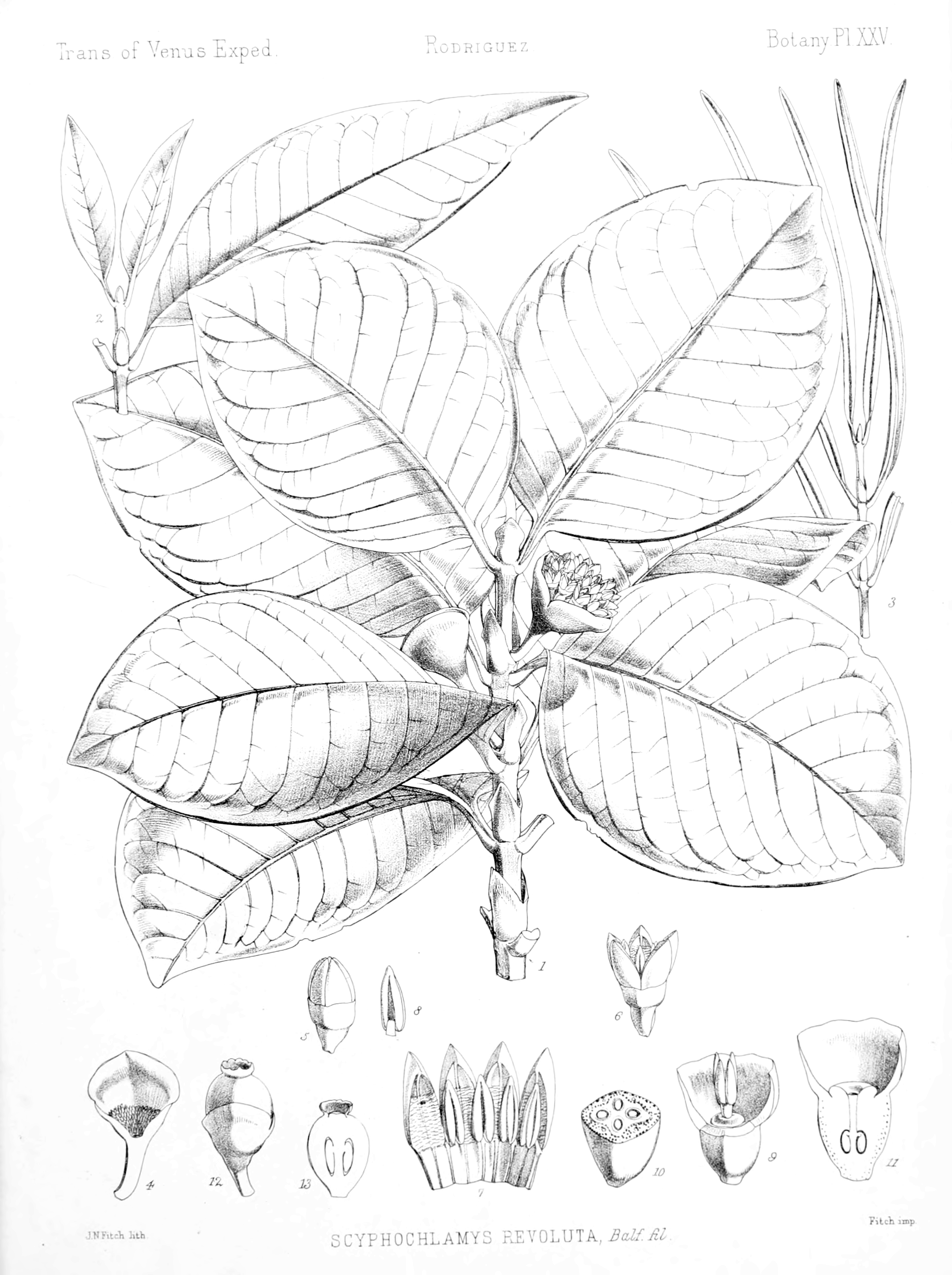

Scientific classification
- Kingdom: Plantae
- Clade: Tracheophytes
- Clade: Angiosperms
- Clade: Eudicots
- Clade: Asterids
- Order: Gentianales
- Family: Rubiaceae
- Genus: Pyrostria
- Species: P. revoluta

Binomial name
- Pyrostria revoluta (Balf.f.) Razafim., Lantz & B.Bremer

Synonyms
- Scyphochlamys revoluta Balf.f.

= Pyrostria revoluta =

Species of plant

Pyrostria revoluta, formerly Scyphochlamys revoluta, is a species of flowering plant in the family Rubiaceae that lives on the island of Rodrigues.

== Distribution and conservation ==
Pyrostria revoluta is found on Rodrigues, one of the Mascarene Islands in the Indian Ocean, and an Outer island of Mauritius. By 1980, it appeared to be restricted to Grande Montagne and Cascade Victoire, and by 1989, the species was considered to be "on the verge of extinction". Some seeds were sent to the Royal Botanic Gardens, Kew, where they were successfully germinated in 1982 and subsequently grown up. Cuttings have since been taken, effectively ensuring the species' survival in cultivation.

== Description ==
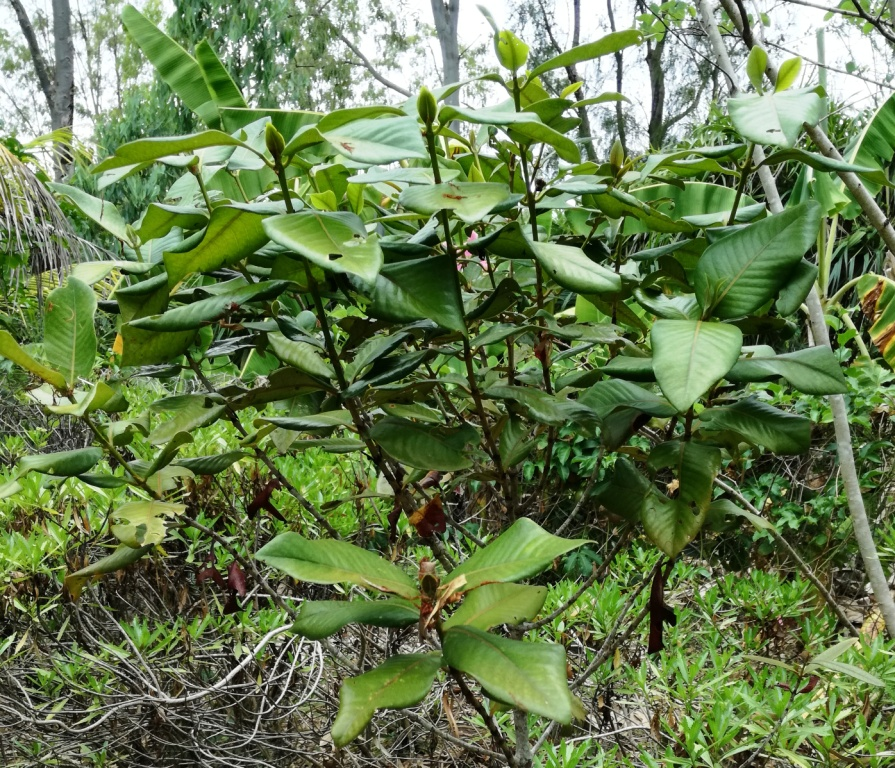
Foliage of young Pyrostria revoluta

Pyrostria revoluta is a shrub or small tree, at up to 4–6 metres (13–20 ft) tall. The leaves are notably dimorphic – they grow in two distinctly different forms. Juvenile leaves are up to 16 centimetres (6.3 in) long, but only 2.5–9.0 mm (0.10–0.35 in) wide. Mature leaves are a similar length, but up to 9.5 cm (3.7 in) wide.

== Taxonomic history ==
Pyrostria revoluta was originally described by Isaac Bayley Balfour in 1877 in the new monotypic genus Scyphochlamys, which was later sunk into synonymy with Pyrostria. It followed a scientific expedition to Rodrigues to observe the 1874 transit of Venus, on which Balfour, along with George Gulliver and Henry Horrocks Slater, served as naturalist.
