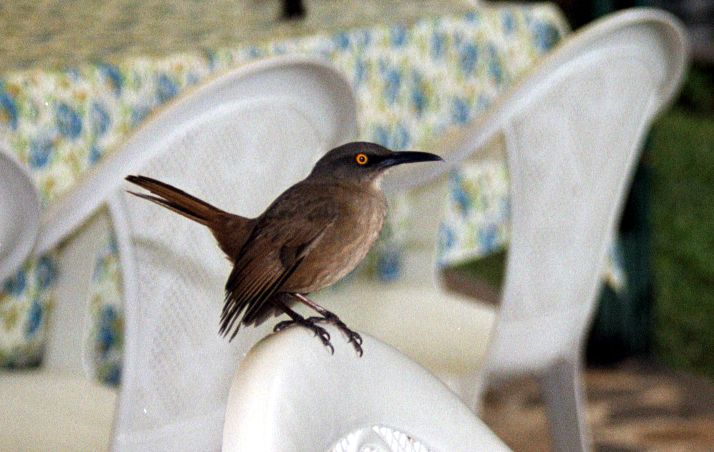
- Brown trembler (Cinclocerthia ruficauda)

Scientific classification
- Kingdom: Animalia
- Phylum: Chordata
- Class: Aves
- Order: Passeriformes
- Family: Mimidae
- Genus: Cinclocerthia; G.R. Gray, 1840

Type species
- Stenorhynchus ruficauda Gould, 1836

Species
- Cinclocerthia gutturalis; Cinclocerthia ruficauda; (but see text)

Synonyms
- Buleites Gistl, 1848; Stenorhynchus Gould, 1838 (non Lamarck, 1818: preoccupied)

= Trembler =

Tremblers

Genus of birds

Tremblers (Cinclocerthia) are a genus of perching birds in the family Mimidae that are endemic to the Lesser Antilles. They are medium-small, mostly brown or grey birds with long beaks and tails that typically are held cocked. Most recent authorities recognize two species in the genus, but some split each into two species, bringing it to four species:

Image	Common name	Scientific name
	Grey trembler (Martinique trembler): Saint Lucia trembler	Cinclocerthia (gutturalis) gutturalis: Cinclocerthia (gutturalis) macrorhyncha
	Brown trembler (southern brown trembler): Northern brown trembler	Cinclocerthia (ruficauda) ruficauda: Cinclocerthia (ruficauda) tremula

Among other living birds, they are apparently most closely related to the pearly-eyed thrasher.

Their common name comes from their constant motion; a much more exaggerated version of the wing-flicking also seen in other mimids such as the northern mockingbirds. The tremblers do not just flick their wings, but shake their entire bodies in a trembling motion. This behaviours is a signal to others of their species, similar to the more common contact call.
