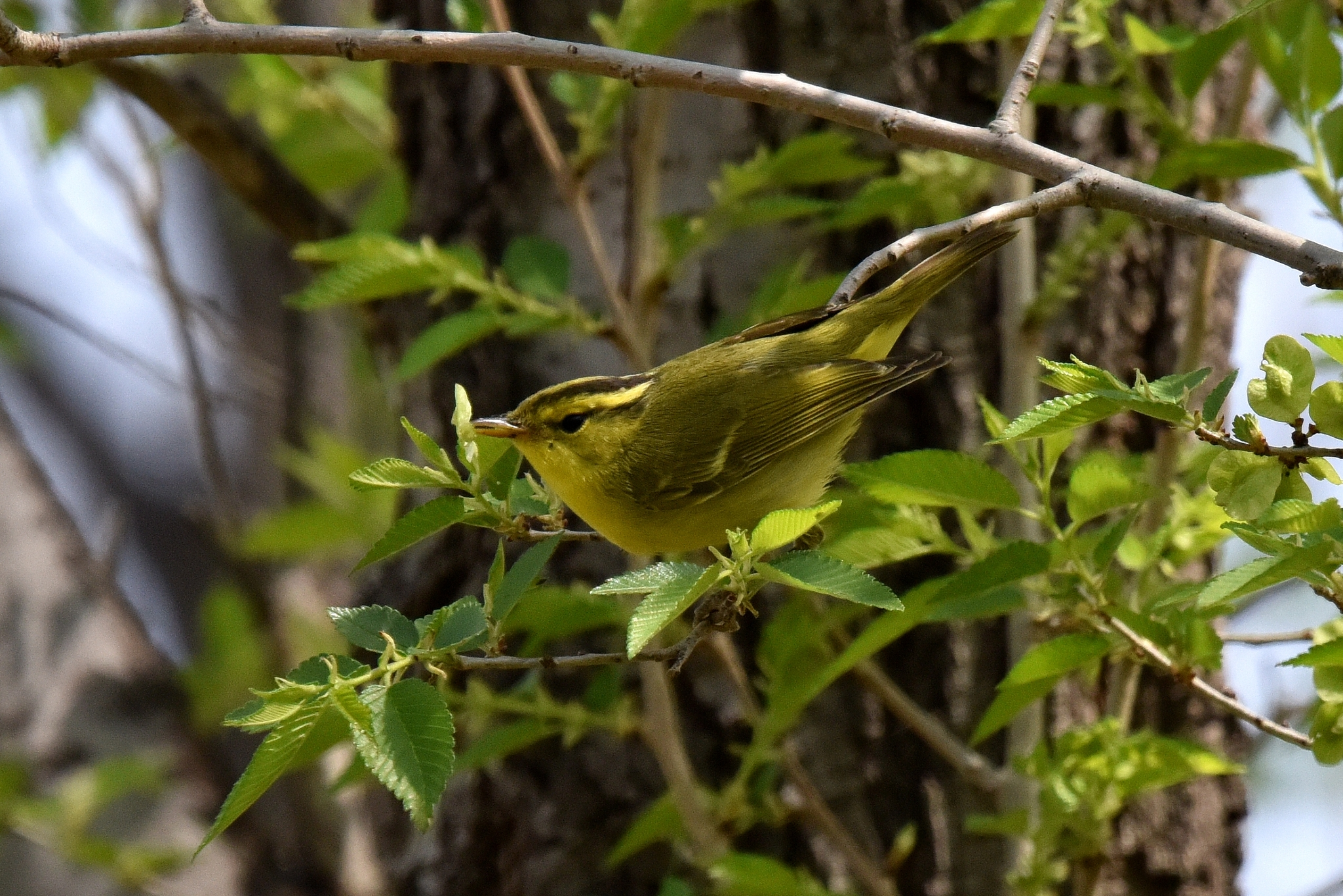
- In Zhengzhou, China

Conservation status
- Least Concern (IUCN 3.1)

Scientific classification
- Kingdom: Animalia
- Phylum: Chordata
- Class: Aves
- Order: Passeriformes
- Family: Phylloscopidae
- Genus: Phylloscopus
- Species: P. ricketti

Binomial name
- Phylloscopus ricketti (Slater, HH, 1897)

= Sulphur-breasted warbler =

Species of bird

The sulphur-breasted warbler (Phylloscopus ricketti) is a species of Old World warbler in the family Phylloscopidae. It breeds in China; it winters to Laos, Thailand and Cambodia. Its natural habitats are temperate forests and subtropical or tropical moist lowland forests.
