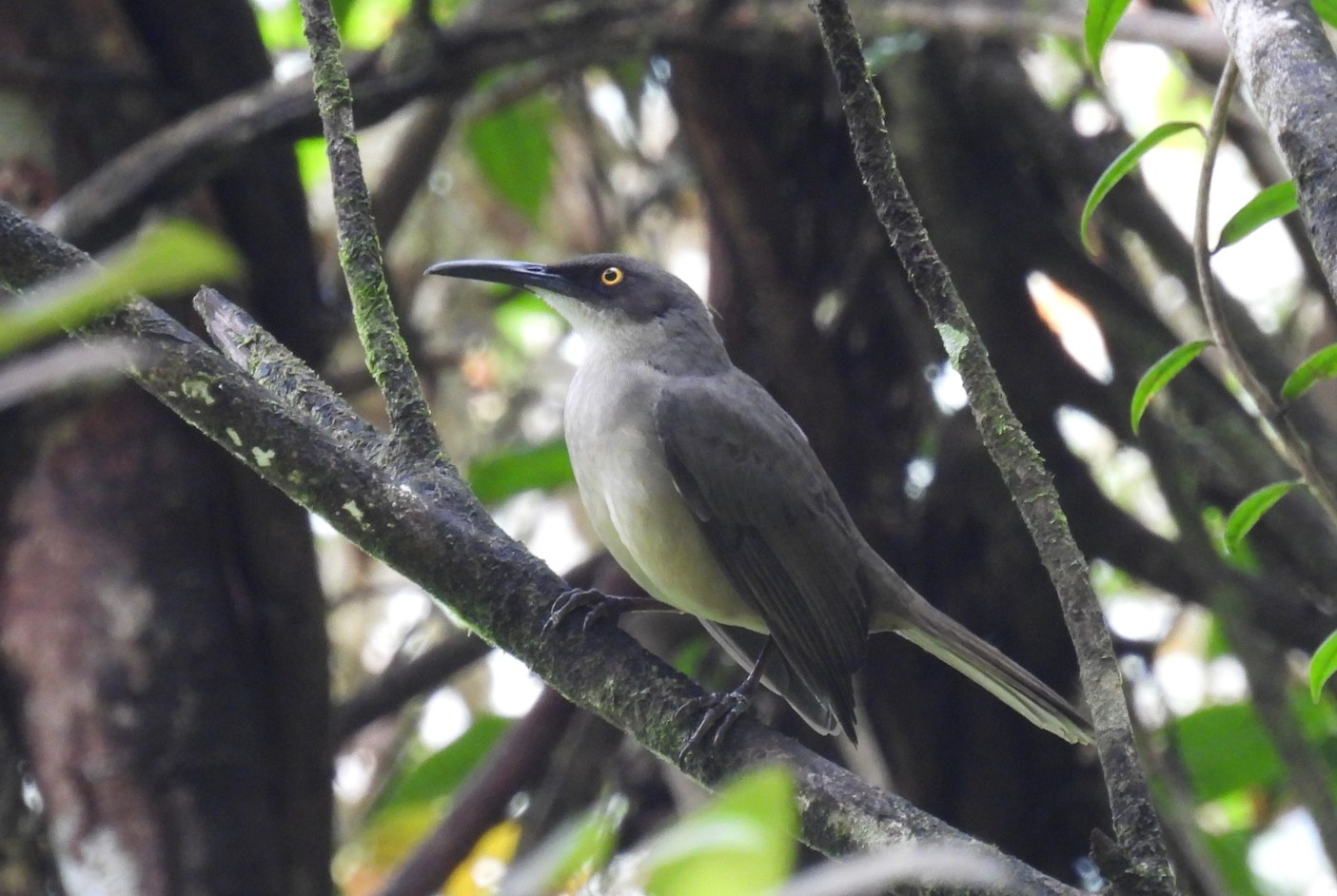

Conservation status
- Least Concern (IUCN 3.1)

Scientific classification
- Kingdom: Animalia
- Phylum: Chordata
- Class: Aves
- Order: Passeriformes
- Family: Mimidae
- Genus: Cinclocerthia
- Species: C. gutturalis

Binomial name
- Cinclocerthia gutturalis (Lafresnaye, 1843)

Synonyms
- Cinclocerthia macrorhyncha Sclater, 1868; Necropsar leguati Forbes, 1898; Orphanopsar leguati (Forbes, 1898); Ramphocinclus gutturalis Lafresnaye, 1843

= Grey trembler =

Species of bird

The grey trembler (Cinclocerthia gutturalis) is a songbird species in the family Mimidae, the mockingbirds and thrashers. It is found only on Martinique and Saint Lucia in the Lesser Antilles of the Caribbean Sea.

== Taxonomy and systematics ==
The grey trembler was formerly thought to be conspecific with the brown trembler (Cinclocerthia ruficauda), the only other member of its genus. It has two subspecies, the nominate C. g. gutturalis and C. g. macrorhyncha.

== The "Mascarene starling" ==
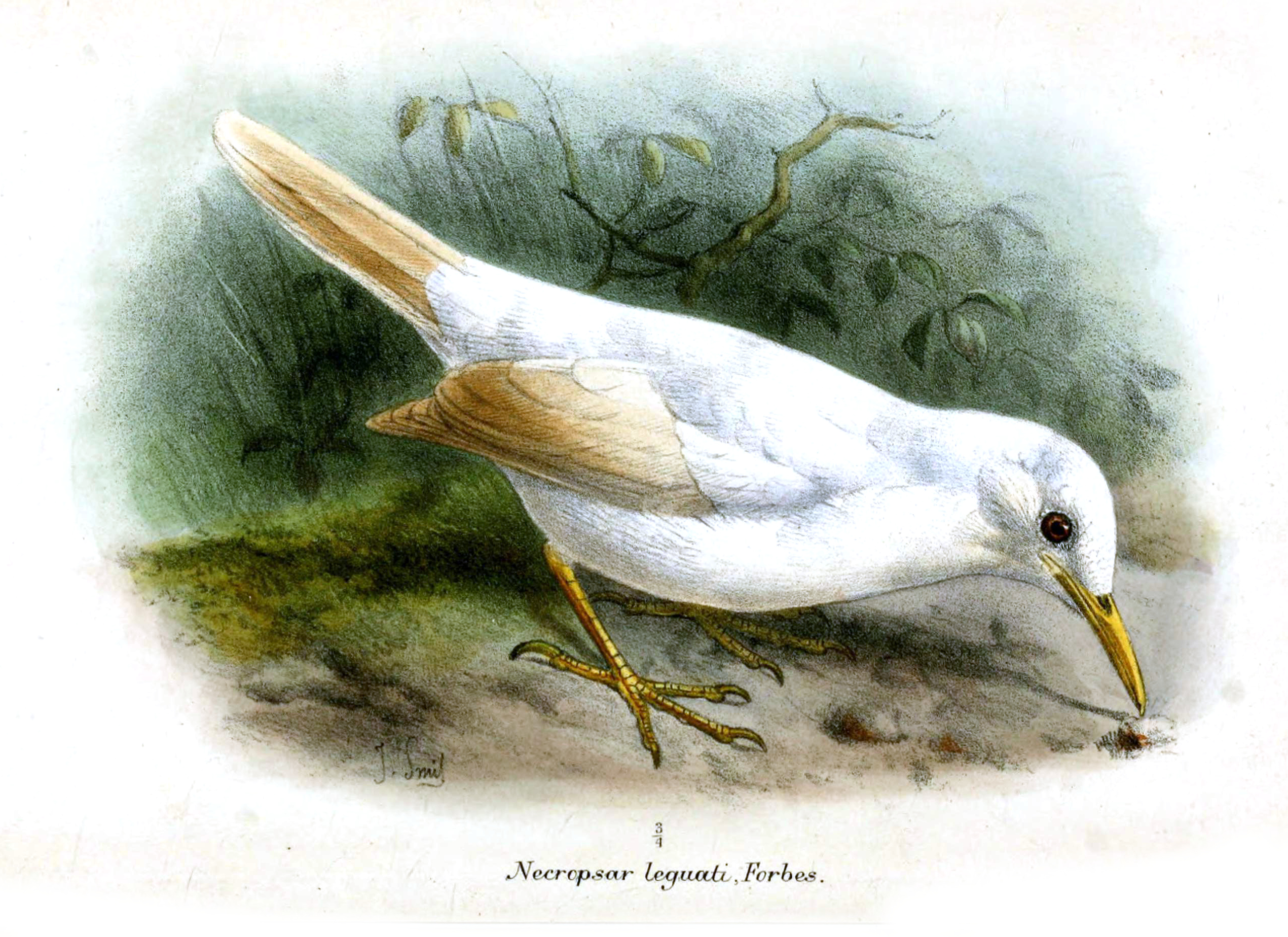
"Mascarene starling"

In 1898 a unique skin (accession number D1792 (S)) was discovered in the World Museum Liverpool. This specimen was obtained by Edward Smith-Stanley, 13th Earl of Derby from bird collector Jules Verreaux in 1850 and was on display in the Liverpool Museum since then. It was believed to be an extinct starling from Madagascar, or the Mascarenes, described by Henry Ogg Forbes under the name Necropsar leguati and sketched by bird illustrator John Gerrard Keulemans. It was thought to be a close relative of the Rodrigues starling. A vernacular name for this supposed species was "white Mascarene starling".

However, in April 2000 analysis of DNA from that specimen by the Smithsonian Institution showed that it was actually a misidentified and mislabeled albinistic example of C. g. gutturalis.

== Description ==
The grey trembler is 23 to 26 cm (9.1 to 10.2 in) long and weighs 65 to 76.2 g (2.29 to 2.69 oz). The species has a long, slightly downcurved bill, the female's longer than the male's. Adults of the nominate subspecies have warm gray-brown upperparts with a somewhat darker face and wings. The throat and the middle of the breast and abdomen are buffy white. The sides of the breast are a lighter gray brown and the flanks browner with an olive tinge. Juveniles are browner and have a mottled chest. C. g. macrorhyncha has a grayer buffy breast and pale cinnamon flanks.

== Distribution and habitat ==
C. g. gutturalis is found only on Martinique and C. g. macrorhyncha on Saint Lucia. Both mostly inhabit wet mature forests but are also found in dryer scrub and open woodland.

== Behavior ==
Tremblers derive their name from a typical behavior "in which the wings both are drooped and angled slightly away from the body...making very rapid vertical and lateral motions.

=== Feeding ===
The grey trembler forages from the ground to the forest canopy, tearing open tangles and probing epiphyte clusters. Its diet has not been studied in detail but includes insects and other invertebrates, fruits, and occasionally small lizards.

=== Breeding ===
The grey trembler breeds in March and April. Two types of nest have been described, an open cup made from thin twigs and dead leaves, and a dome made of dried grass. The clutch size is two or three.

=== Vocalization ===
The grey trembler's song is "[r]epeated notes and phrases, harsh to melodic, quavering whistles".

== Status ==
The IUCN has assessed the grey trembler as being of Least Concern. Though it is found only on two islands, it is fairly common on both. No threats are known "other than those implicit in its very restricted geographical range."
