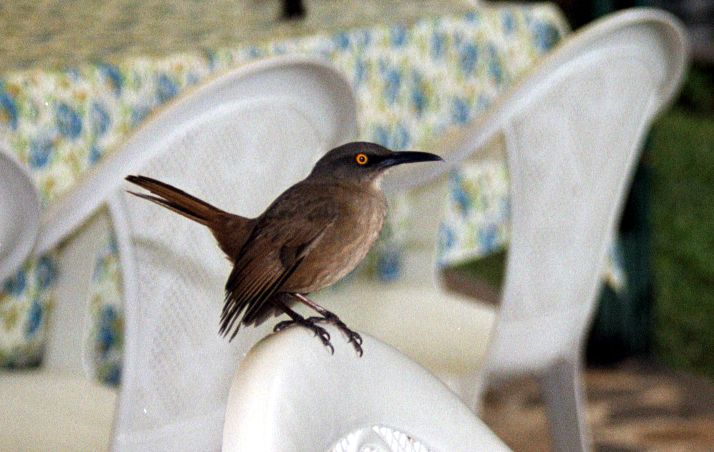
- In Dominica

Conservation status
- Least Concern (IUCN 3.1)

Scientific classification
- Kingdom: Animalia
- Phylum: Chordata
- Class: Aves
- Order: Passeriformes
- Family: Mimidae
- Genus: Cinclocerthia
- Species: C. ruficauda

Binomial name
- Cinclocerthia ruficauda (Gould, 1836)

= Brown trembler =

Species of bird

The brown trembler (Cinclocerthia ruficauda) is a species of bird in the family Mimidae, the mockingbirds and thrashers. It is found on the islands of Saba, St. Kitts, Nevis, Montserrat, Guadeloupe, Dominica and St. Vincent in the Lesser Antilles of the Caribbean Sea.

== Taxonomy and systematics ==
The taxonomy of genus Cinclocerthia is not fully resolved. The International Ornithological Committee (IOC) recognizes the brown trembler and the grey trembler (C. gutturalis). It divides the brown trembler into four subspecies, the nominate C. r. ruficauda, C. r. pavida, C. r. tremula, and C. r. tenebrosa. However, there is significant phylogenetic evidence that brown tremblers from Guadeloupe northwards may represent a separate species (C. tremula) from those on the other islands. Some authors consider tremula to be part of ruficauda

== Description ==
The nominate subspecies of brown trembler is 20.5 to 26 cm (8.1 to 10.2 in) long; males weigh 47.6 to 65.4 g (1.68 to 2.31 oz) and females 42.8 to 71 g (1.51 to 2.50 oz). The species has a long, slightly downcurved bill, the female's longer than the male's. Adults are mostly shades of brown. Their crown is a deep grayish brown, the nape less gray, the back an olive brown, and the rump and tail a reddish brown. The face is blackish through the eye with grayish olive brown cheeks. The chin and throat are pale grayish buff that becomes browner on the breast and belly. The sides and flanks are cinnamon. The juvenile is similar with faint dusky spots on the breast.

C. r. pavida is larger than the nominate but is otherwise similar. C. r. tenebrosa is also similar to the nominate, but its upperparts are darker and sootier and the breast more grayish. C. r. tremula is similar to tenebrosa but much larger.

== Distribution and habitat ==
Subspecies C. r. pavida of the brown trembler is the most widely distributed; it is found in the northern Lesser Antilles from Saba south to Montserrat. C. r. tremula is restricted to Guadeloupe, the nominate C. r. ruficauda to Dominica, and C. r. tenebrosa to St. Vincent.

The brown trembler mostly inhabits humid evergreen forest but is also found in secondary forest and plantations. In elevation it ranges from sea level to about 900 m (2,950 ft).

== Behavior ==
Tremblers derive their name from a typical behavior "in which the wings both are drooped and angled slightly away from the body...making very rapid vertical and lateral motions.

=== Feeding ===
The brown trembler forages on the ground, in the understory, and in the midstory. It tosses leaves with its bill and more typically probes epiphytes, gaps between vines and trunks, and clusters of dead leaves. Its diet includes a wide variety of fruit, arthropods, and small vertebrates.

=== Breeding ===
Little is known about the brown trembler's breeding phenology. It apparently breeds in March and April. The only documented nest was in a coconut palm, "cup-shaped and ... composed of rootlets, lined with finer rootlets and dead leaves".

=== Vocalization ===
The brown trembler's principal song is "a series of variable loud phrases ranging in quality from 'rather harsh, others rich and warbled, still others high and squeaky'" It also has "subsongs" delivered less frequently. A common call is "a nasal, rasping yeeeah, often repeated many times".

== Status ==
The IUCN has assessed the brown trembler as being of Least Concern. However, its population size and trend have not been determined and "it is likely that further deforestation and conversion to plantations or other human settlement will result in a population decrease."
