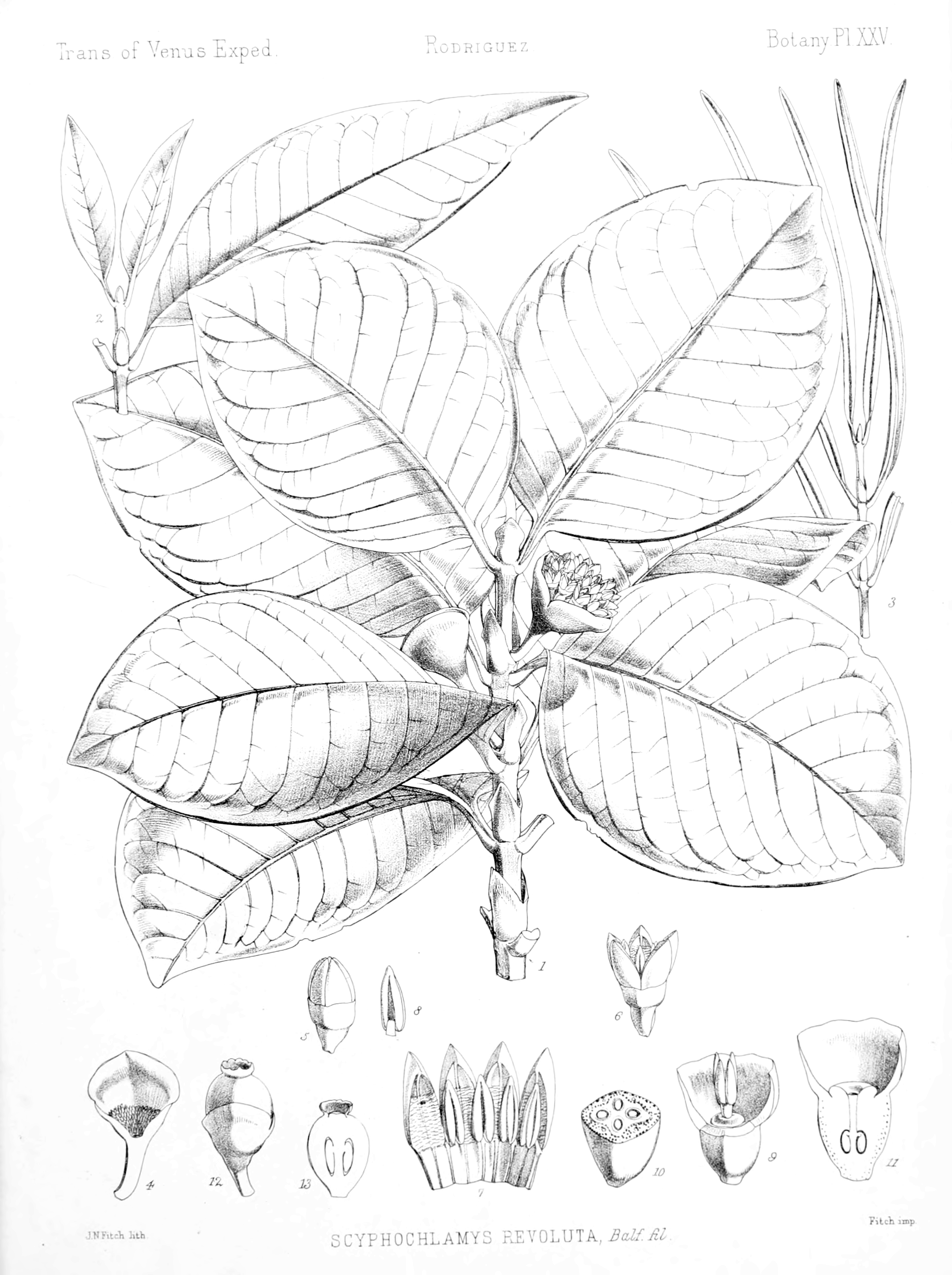
- Pyrostria revoluta

Scientific classification
- Kingdom: Plantae
- Clade: Tracheophytes
- Clade: Angiosperms
- Clade: Eudicots
- Clade: Asterids
- Order: Gentianales
- Family: Rubiaceae
- Subfamily: Dialypetalanthoideae
- Tribe: Vanguerieae
- Genus: Pyrostria; Comm. ex A.Juss. (1789)

Synonyms
- Dinocanthium Bremek. (1933); Leroyia Cavaco (1970); Neoleroya Cavaco (1971); Pseudopeponidium Homolle (1960); Scyphochlamys Balf.f. (1877)

= Pyrostria =

Genus of flowering plants

Pyrostria is a genus of dioecious flowering plants in the family Rubiaceae. Most of the species are endemic to Madagascar, others occur on islands in the western Indian Ocean (Mauritius, Comoros, Réunion, Rodrigues, Socotra), a few are found in continental Africa, and only six species occur in tropical Southeast Asia. The formerly recognized genus Leroya, containing two species endemic to Madagascar, L. madagascariensis and L. richardiae, was sunk into synonymy with Pyrostria.

== Species ==
- Pyrostria affinis (Robyns) Bridson
- Pyrostria alaotrensis Arènes ex Cavaco
- Pyrostria alluaudii Arènes ex Cavaco
- Pyrostria ambongensis (Homolle ex Arènes) Razafim. Lantz & B.Bremer
- Pyrostria ampijoroensis (Arènes) Razafim., Lantz & B.Bremer
- Pyrostria amporoforensis Cavaco
- Pyrostria analamazaotrensis Arènes ex Cavaco
- Pyrostria andilanensis Cavaco
- Pyrostria andringitrensis (Cavaco) Kainulainen & Razafim.
- Pyrostria angustifolia (A.Rich. ex DC.) Kainulainen & Razafim.
- Pyrostria anjouanensis Arènes ex Cavaco
- Pyrostria ankaranensis (Cavaco) Razafim., Lantz, B.Bremer
- Pyrostria ankazobeensis Arènes ex Cavaco
- Pyrostria antsalovensis (Cavaco) Razafim., Lantz & B.Bremer
- Pyrostria antsirananensis Razafim., Lantz & B.Bremer
- Pyrostria asosa (Arènes) Razafim., Lantz & B.Bremer
- Pyrostria bibracteata (Baker) Cavaco
- Pyrostria bispathacea (Mildbr.) Bridson
- Pyrostria breonii (Baill.) Cavaco
- Pyrostria brunnescens (Craib) Utteridge & A.P.Davis
- Pyrostria capuronii (Cavaco) Razafim., Lantz & B.Bremer
- Pyrostria chapmanii Bridson
- Pyrostria cochinchinensis (Pierre ex Pit.) Utteridge & A.P.Davis
- Pyrostria commersonii J.F.Gmel.
- Pyrostria cordifolia A.Rich. ex DC.
- Pyrostria elmeri (Merr.) Arriola, Meve & Alejandro
- Pyrostria fasciculata Bojer ex Baker
- Pyrostria ferruginea Verdc.
- Pyrostria heliconioides Mouly
- Pyrostria hystrix (Bremek.) Bridson
- Pyrostria inflata (Cavaco) A.P.Davis
- Pyrostria isomonensis (Cavaco) A.P.Davis & Govaerts
- Pyrostria italyensis (Cavaco) A.P.Davis & Govaerts
- Pyrostria ixorifolia (Homolle ex Arènes) Razafim., Lantz, B.Bremer
- Pyrostria lobulata Bridson
- Pyrostria longiflora (Cavaco) Razafim., Lantz & B.Bremer
- Pyrostria louvelii Razafim., Lantz & B.Bremer
- Pyrostria macrophylla A.Rich. ex DC.
- Pyrostria madagascariensis Lecomte
- Pyrostria major (A.Rich. ex DC.) Kainulainen & Razafim.
- Pyrostria mandrarensis (Cavaco) Kainulainen & Razafim.
- Pyrostria media (A.Rich. ex DC.) Kainulainen & Razafim.
- Pyrostria montana (Arènes) Kainulainen & Razafim.
- Pyrostria neriifolia (Homolle ex Arènes) Razafim., Lantz & B.Bremer
- Pyrostria obovatifolia (Merr.) A.E.D.Wong, Magdaleno & Alejandro
- Pyrostria oleifolia (Homolle ex Arènes) Razafim., Lantz & B.Bremer
- Pyrostria oligophlebia (Merr.) Pacia, Quiogue & Alejandro
- Pyrostria orbicularis A.Rich. ex DC.
- Pyrostria pendula Lantz, Klack. & Razafim.
- Pyrostria perrieri (Cavaco) Razafim., Lantz & B.Bremer
- Pyrostria phyllanthoidea (Baill.) Bridson
- Pyrostria pseudocommersonii Cavaco
- Pyrostria ramosii (Merr.) Arriola, Parag. & Alejandro
- Pyrostria revoluta (Balf.f.) Razafim., Lantz & B.Bremer
- Pyrostria richardiae (Cavaco) Razafim., Lantz & B.Bremer
- Pyrostria sambavensis (Cavaco) Razafim., Lantz & B.Bremer
- Pyrostria sarodranensis Cavaco
- Pyrostria serpentina Lantz, Klack. & Razafim.
- Pyrostria socotrana (Radcl.-Sm.) Bridson
- Pyrostria suarezensis (Cavaco) Razafim., Lantz & B.Bremer
- Pyrostria triflora Arriola, Calaramo & Alejandro
- Pyrostria tulearensis (Cavaco) Razafim., Lantz & B.Bremer
- Pyrostria urschii Arènes ex Cavaco
- Pyrostria uzungwaensis Bridson
- Pyrostria variistipula Arènes ex Cavaco
- Pyrostria verdcourtii (Cavaco) Razafim., Lantz & B.Bremer
- Pyrostria viburnoides (Baker) Verdc.
