= Pyrostria verdcourtii =

Scientific classification
- Kingdom: Plantae
- Clade: Tracheophytes
- Clade: Angiosperms
- Clade: Eudicots
- Clade: Asterids
- Order: Gentianales
- Family: Rubiaceae
- Subfamily: Dialypetalanthoideae
- Tribe: Vanguerieae
- Genus: Pyrostria
- Species: P. verdcourtii

Binomial name
- Pyrostria verdcourtii (Cavaco) Razafim., Lantz & B.Bremer (2007)

Synonyms
- Neoleroya verdcourtii Cavaco (1971)

Genus of plants

Pyrostria verdcourtii is a species of flowering plant in the family Rubiaceae. It is a tree endemic to Madagascar. It was first described as Neoleroya verdcourtii in 1971 and placed in the monotypic genus Neoleroya. In 2007 it was sunk into genus Pyrostria as Pyrostria verdcourtii.
