= Pyrostria socotrana =

Conservation status
- Vulnerable (IUCN 3.1)

Scientific classification
- Kingdom: Plantae
- Clade: Tracheophytes
- Clade: Angiosperms
- Clade: Eudicots
- Clade: Asterids
- Order: Gentianales
- Family: Rubiaceae
- Genus: Pyrostria
- Species: P. socotrana

Binomial name
- Pyrostria socotrana (Radcl.-Sm.) Bridson (1987)

Synonyms
- Canthium socotranum Radcl.-Sm. (1971)

Species of plant

Pyrostria socotrana is a species of flowering plant in the family Rubiaceae. It is a shrub endemic to the Hajhir Mountains on the island of Socotra in Yemen. It grows in submontane semi-deciduous woodland from 850 to 1,000 metres elevation.
