= Henry H. Slater =

English scientist (1851–1934)

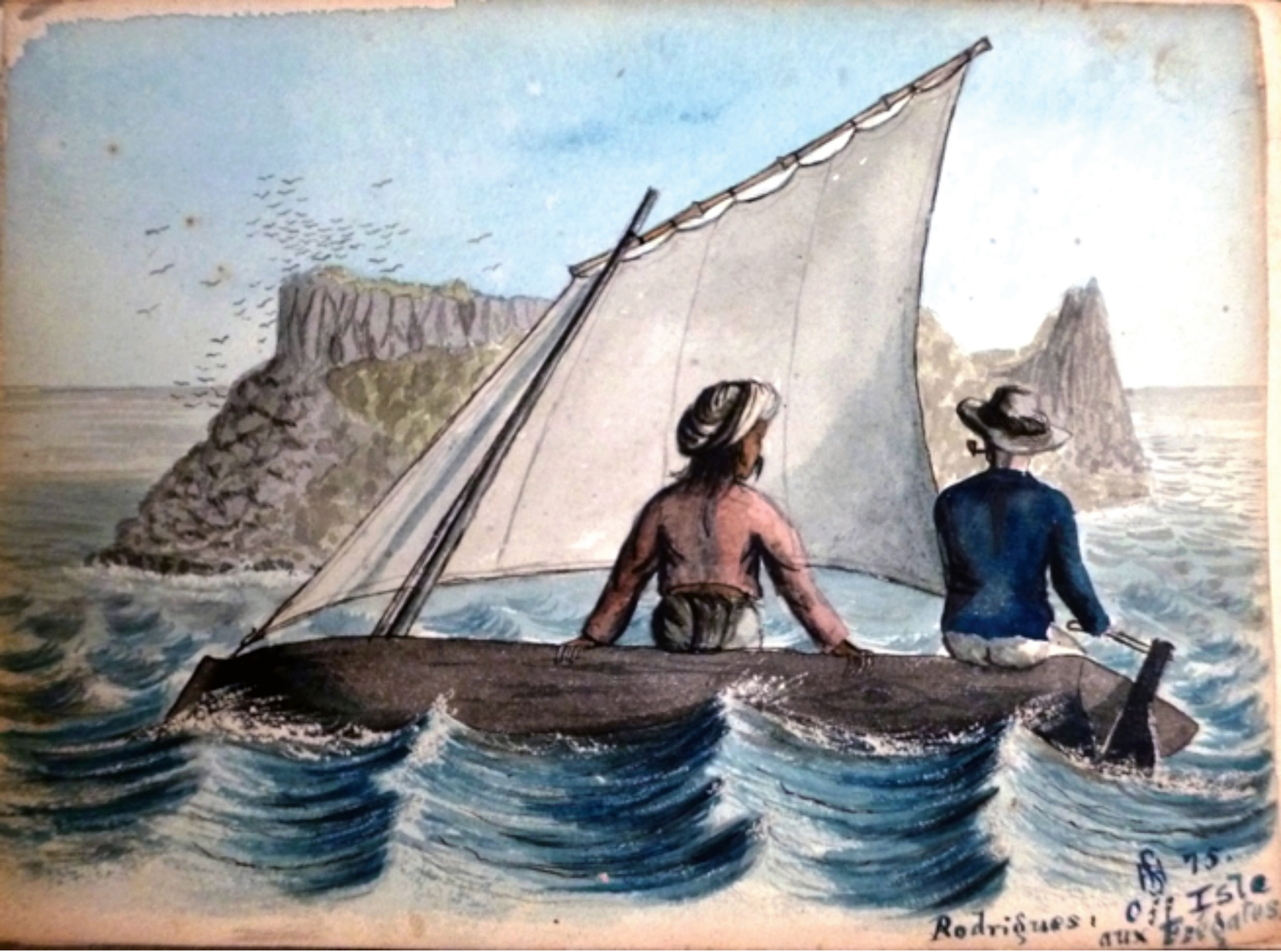
1875 self-portrait of Slater and a fisherman off Rodrigues

Henry Horrocks Slater (1851–26 November 1934) was an English parson-naturalist who studied ornithology, entomology, and botany.

== Early life and clerical career ==
Slater was born in Stanhope, County Durham, the son of the priest Henry Slater and his wife Mary Sarah Horrocks. He was matriculated at St Catharine's College, Cambridge in 1870, and graduated as a Bachelor of Arts in 1880 (made Master of Arts in 1887). In 1879 he was ordained a deacon in Ripon, West Riding of Yorkshire. In 1881 he was ordained as a priest. From 1879 to 1882 he was chaplain in Sharow, near Ripon, and from 1882 to 1883 he was chaplain in Chearsley, Buckinghamshire. From 1883 to 1893 he was vicar of Irchester. From 1893 to 1906 he was rector of Thornhaugh, Northamptonshire. He retired at Bishops Lydeard and died there in 1934.

== Natural history work ==
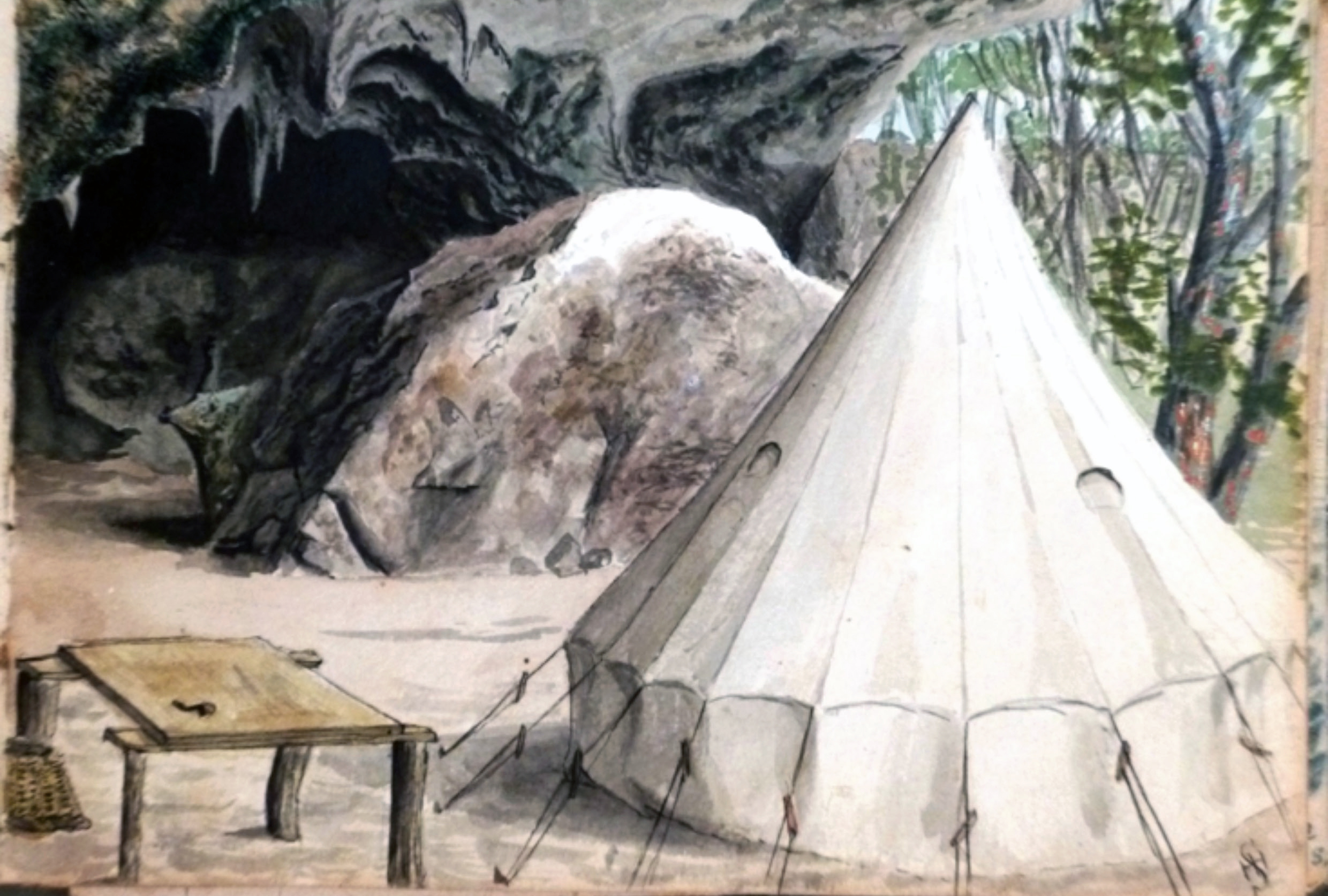
Slater's tent outside La Grande Caverne, Rodrigues

In 1874 he accompanied the botanist Isaac Bayley Balfour and George Gulliver aboard HMS Shearwater on an expedition to observe the transit of Venus on the island of Rodrigues in the Indian Ocean. In addition to studies of the flora and fauna, Slater excavated the subfossil bones of extinct birds, including the Rodrigues solitaire (Pezophaps solitaria) and Rodrigues starling (Necropsar rodericanus). His records were used by the zoologists Albert Günther and Alfred Newton to write the first scientific description of the Rodrigues starling in 1879. During a stay in Mauritius in 1875 he and Gulliver explored the flora, the herpetofauna, and the aquatic avifauna. In 1885 he traveled with Thomas Carter to Iceland.

In 1897 Slater described the short-tailed parrotbill (Paradoxornis davidianus) and the sulphur-breasted warbler (Phylloscopus ricketti).

Together with William Bernhardt Tegetmeier he wrote the fifth volume of British Birds With Their Nests and Eggs (1898), that was illustrated by Frederick William Frohawk.

He visited Iceland three times and wrote the Manual of the Birds of Iceland, published in 1901.

Slater was elected a Fellow of the Zoological Society of London (FZS) in December 1877. He was also a Member of the British Ornithologists' Union (MBOU) since 1882, but he resigned from both organizations in 1906, when he left Thornhaugh.

== Bibliography ==
- Slater, Rev. H.H. (1881). "The Island of Rodrigues and its Fauna, as they were and as they are". The Naturalist. 6–7 (72–74): 177–181, 2–6, 25–30.
- Slater, Henry H. (1884). "The Ornithology of Riding Mill on Tyne and Neighbourhood". The Zoologist. 3rd series, vol. 8 (87): 92–106.
- Butler, Arthur G.; Mathew, Rev. Murray A.; Forbes, Henry O.; Cordeaux, John; Tegetmeier, W.B.; Slater, Rev. Henry H.; Aplin, O.V.; Macpherson, Rev. H.A. (1896–1898). British Birds with their Nests and Eggs. London: Brumby & Clarke. (in six volumes; Slater wrote the chapter on the Order Limicolæ in vol. 5).
- Slater, Henry Horrocks (1901). Manual of the Birds of Iceland. Edinburgh: D. Douglas. OCLC 6289368 (all editions).

== Sources ==
- Armstrong, Patrick (2000). The English Parson-naturalist: A Companionship Between Science and Religion. Leominster: Gracewing. ISBN 978-0-85244-516-7.
- Beolens, Bo; Watkins, Michael (2003). Whose Bird?: Common Bird Names and the People They Commemorate. Yale University Press. ISBN 0-300-10359-X.
- Cheke, Anthony S.; Hume, Julian (2008). Lost Land of the Dodo: An Ecological History of Mauritius, Réunion & Rodrigues. London: T. & A. D. Poyser. ISBN 978-0-7136-6544-4.
- M[athews], G[regory] M[acalister] (1936). "Obituary: Rev. Henry H. Slater". Ibis. 78 (2): 385–386. doi:10.1111/j.1474-919X.1936.tb03390.x.
- Mullens, William Herbert; Swann, Harry Kirke (1917). A Bibliography of British Ornithology. London: Macmillan.
- Venn, John (1954). Alumni cantabrigienses: A biographical list of all known students, graduates and holders of office at the University of Cambridge, from the earliest times to 1900, Part 2. Vol. 5. Cambridge University Press.
