= Shem Creek =

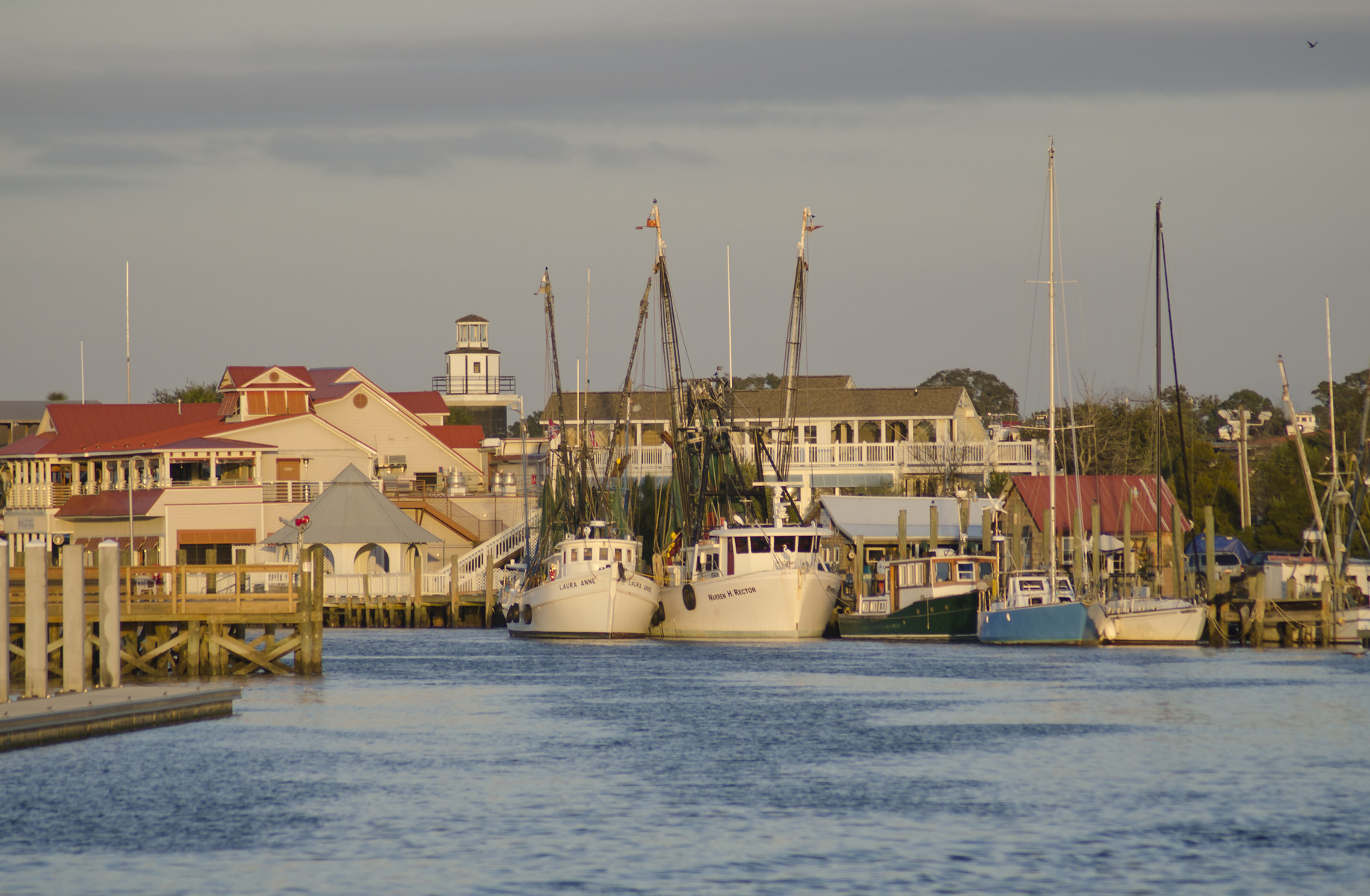
- Photograph of Shem Creek, circa 2011

Location
- Country: United States

Physical characteristics
- Mouth: Charleston Harbor
  - coordinates: 32°47′20″N 79°53′12″W

Shem Creek is a creek that runs through the city of Charleston and Town of Mount Pleasant in the U.S. state of South Carolina, and empties to the Charleston Harbor. The creek's waterfront and boardwalk is a popular destination for restaurants, bars, and recreational activities. The creek is also home to a marina, public and private boating docks, a fisherman's dock, and fish markets.

== History ==
Shem Creek was originally inhabited by the Sewee Native American tribe. The name of the creek is thought to derive from the Native American word Shemee.

In the 1740s, Peter Villepontoux operated a lime kiln on the bank of the creek. During this period, several businessmen established ferries which operated along the creek.

During the 1800s, several mills and factories were stationed on the creek, but commerce along the creek came to a halt during the American Civil War.

In 1905, the Shem Creek Beacon was erected, which provided light to the creek and aided boaters. In 1937, a bridge was built over the creek.

By the 1950s, the first shrimp dock was constructed along Shem Creek and the seafood industry became highly active along the creek. Shelmore Oyster Products began working along the creek in the 1940s, and Abundant Seafood operates from the creek.

In 1989, Hurricane Hugo, hundreds of boats in Shem Creek were left in derelict condition or capsized.

In October 2011, the Shem Creek Boardwalk and Shem Creek Park opened to the public. The Shem Creek Park and 3,000 foot boardwalk is maintained by the Town of Mount Pleasant.

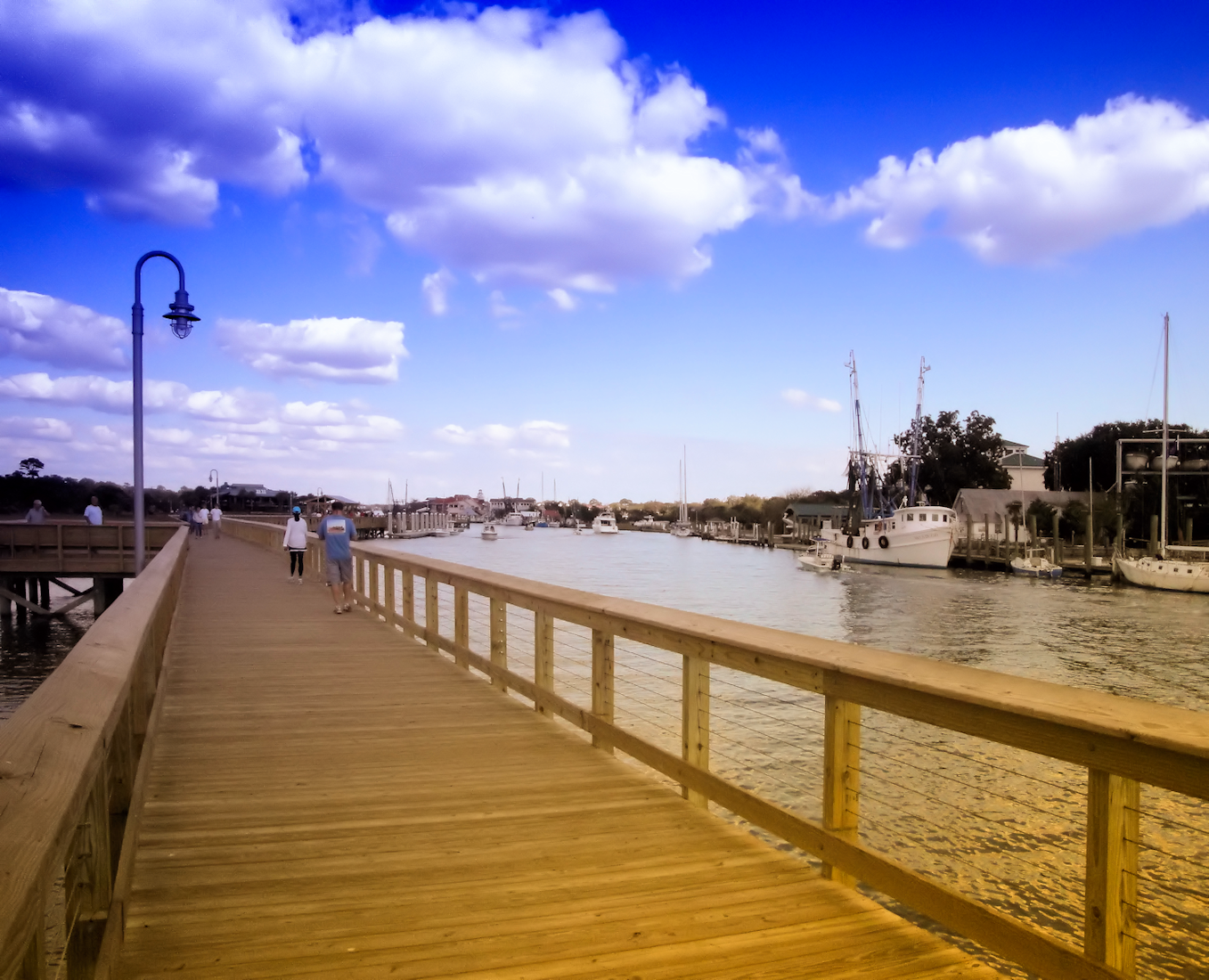
Photograph of Shem Creek Boardwalk, circa 2012

=== Wildlife ===
The creek is known for the variety of wildlife, including manatees, dolphins, egret, black skimmers, and American oystercatchers.

== In popular culture ==
Shem Creek is the setting in Dorothea Benton Frank's 2004 novel, Shem Creek: A Lowcountry Tale (ISBN 978-0425196083).

Many of the boating scenes in the Netflix series Outer Banks were filmed on Shem Creek. The creek and boardwalk was also a filming location for the comedy series The Righteous Gemstones.

== See also ==
- Mount Pleasant, South Carolina
