= Hurricane Hugo =

Category 5 Atlantic hurricane in 1989

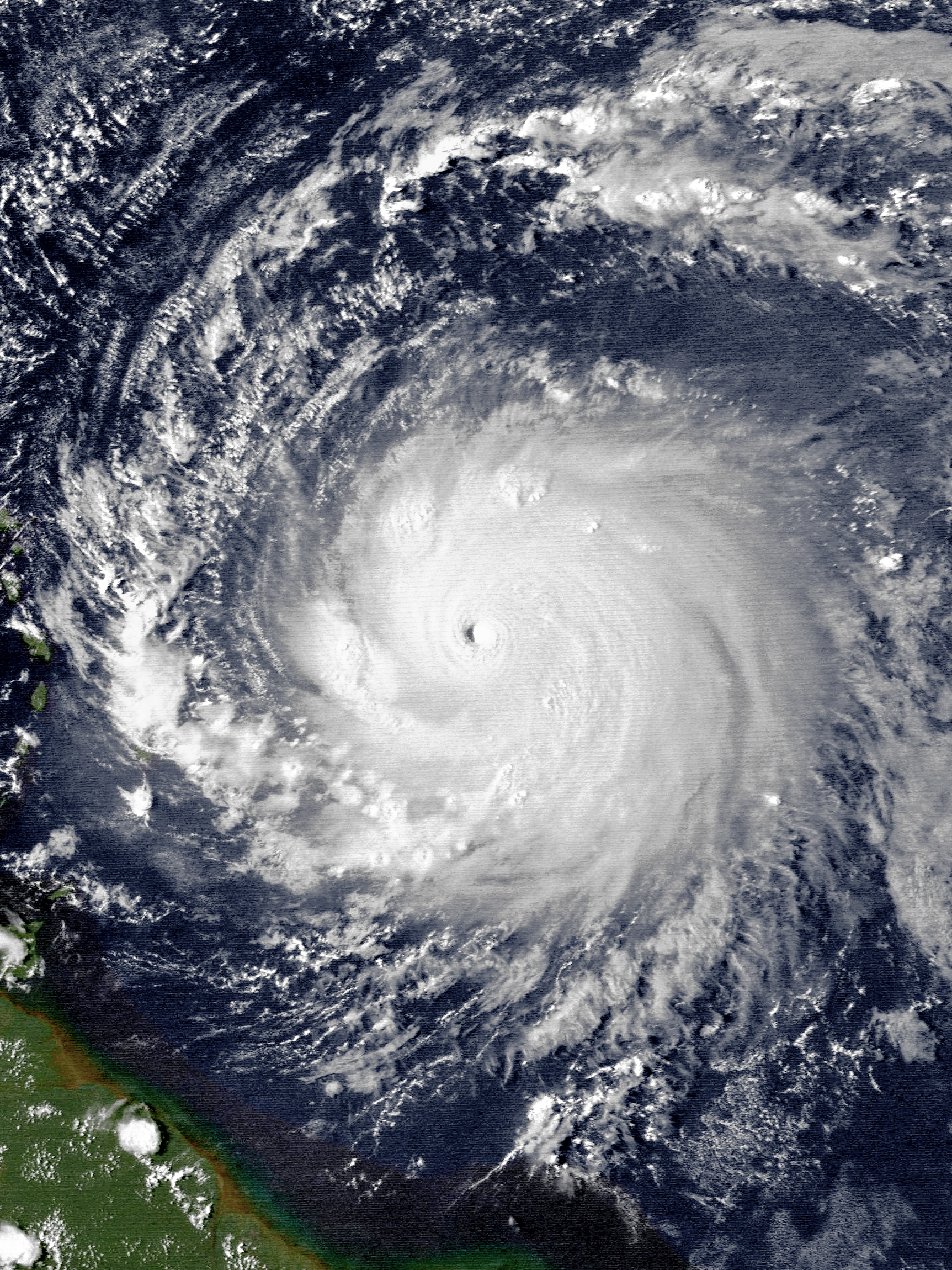
- Hurricane Hugo at peak intensity east of the Lesser Antilles on September 15

Meteorological history
- Formed: September 10, 1989
- Extratropical: September 23, 1989
- Dissipated: September 25, 1989

Category 5 major hurricane
- 1-minute sustained (SSHWS/NWS)
- Highest winds: 160 mph (260 km/h)
- Lowest pressure: 918 mbar (hPa); 27.11 inHg

Overall effects
- Fatalities: 107 (67 direct, 40 indirect)
- Damage: $11 billion (1989 USD)
- Areas affected: Cape Verde; Lesser Antilles; Puerto Rico; Dominican Republic; East Coast of the United States; Atlantic Canada; Southern Greenland
- IBTrACS
- Part of the 1989 Atlantic hurricane season

Hurricane Hugo was a powerful and very impactful tropical cyclone that inflicted widespread destruction across the northeastern Caribbean and the Southeastern United States in September 1989. The eleventh tropical cyclone, eighth named storm, sixth hurricane, and second major hurricane (Note: A major hurricane is a storm that ranks as Category 3 or higher on the Saffir–Simpson hurricane scale.) of the 1989 Atlantic hurricane season, Hugo arose from a cluster of thunderstorms near Cape Verde on September 10, 1989. This cluster coalesced into a tropical depression and strengthened into Tropical Storm Hugo as it tracked west across the Atlantic Ocean for several days. On September 13, Hugo became a hurricane and continued to intensify through September 15 when its sustained winds peaked at 160 mph (255 km/h), making it a Category 5 hurricane on the Saffir–Simpson scale. Between September 17 and 21, Hugo made landfall on Guadeloupe, Saint Croix, Puerto Rico, and lastly South Carolina, with major hurricane strength winds. The storm weakened inland and accelerated north over the Eastern United States, transitioning into an extratropical cyclone on September 23 before it was last noted in the far northern Atlantic on September 25.

Hugo left extensive damage in its wake, causing 61 deaths and $11 billion (equivalent to $29 billion in 2025) in damage, which at the time, made it the costliest tropical cyclone on record worldwide. (Note: The death and damage tolls are aggregated from different sources focusing on individual areas. Some sources provide disparate fatality figures; the National Hurricane Center preliminary report on Hugo reported 49 deaths. At least another 31 people were killed before or after the storm's passage. The National Weather Service in Wilmington, North Carolina, reports 86 total deaths in connection with Hugo.) Guadeloupe bore the brunt of the storm in the Leeward Islands. Three thousand houses were unroofed, contributing to the displacement of 35,000 people from their homes. Hugo was Montserrat's costliest hurricane on record and brought down the island's entire power grid. Ninety percent of homes on the island suffered significant to total roof loss after the island was struck by the eyewall. The hurricane's impacts continued into the Virgin Islands and Puerto Rico, causing over $1 billion in damage. Wind gusts up to 168 mph (270 km/h) were measured in Saint Croix, where property damage exceeded $500 million with over 90 percent of buildings damaged; three people were killed on the island. Widespread damage occurred in Puerto Rico and much of the island suffered power and water service failures. Eight people were killed in Puerto Rico and nearly 28,000 people were left homeless. In the United States, coastal South Carolina was hit by record setting storm surge heights, reaching 20.2 ft (6.2 m) near McClellanville. The surge and strong winds wrought extensive damage to buildings and infrastructure across South Carolina, and caused 13 deaths. Flood and wind impacts followed Hugo across much of the Eastern United States into Eastern Canada.

There were widespread and significant agricultural impacts from Hugo. Guadeloupe sustained damage to the entirety of its banana crop and most of its coconut palms and sugar cane crop. Habitat loss caused bat populations in Montserrat to fall 20-fold, while the populations of several endemic bird species declined or were disrupted across the eastern Caribbean. Coastal bird populations in South Carolina were forced 200 mi (320 km) inland. Additionally, forests between South Carolina and Virginia were heavily damaged; in South Carolina alone the loss of timber was estimated at $1.04 billion.

Hugo was the strongest hurricane to strike the northeastern Caribbean since Hurricane David in 1979, and the strongest to make landfall on the continental U.S. since Hurricane Camille in 1969. The scale of the hurricane's impacts led to the retirement of the name Hugo from the Atlantic tropical cyclone name list, being replaced by Humberto for the 1995 hurricane season.

== Meteorological history ==
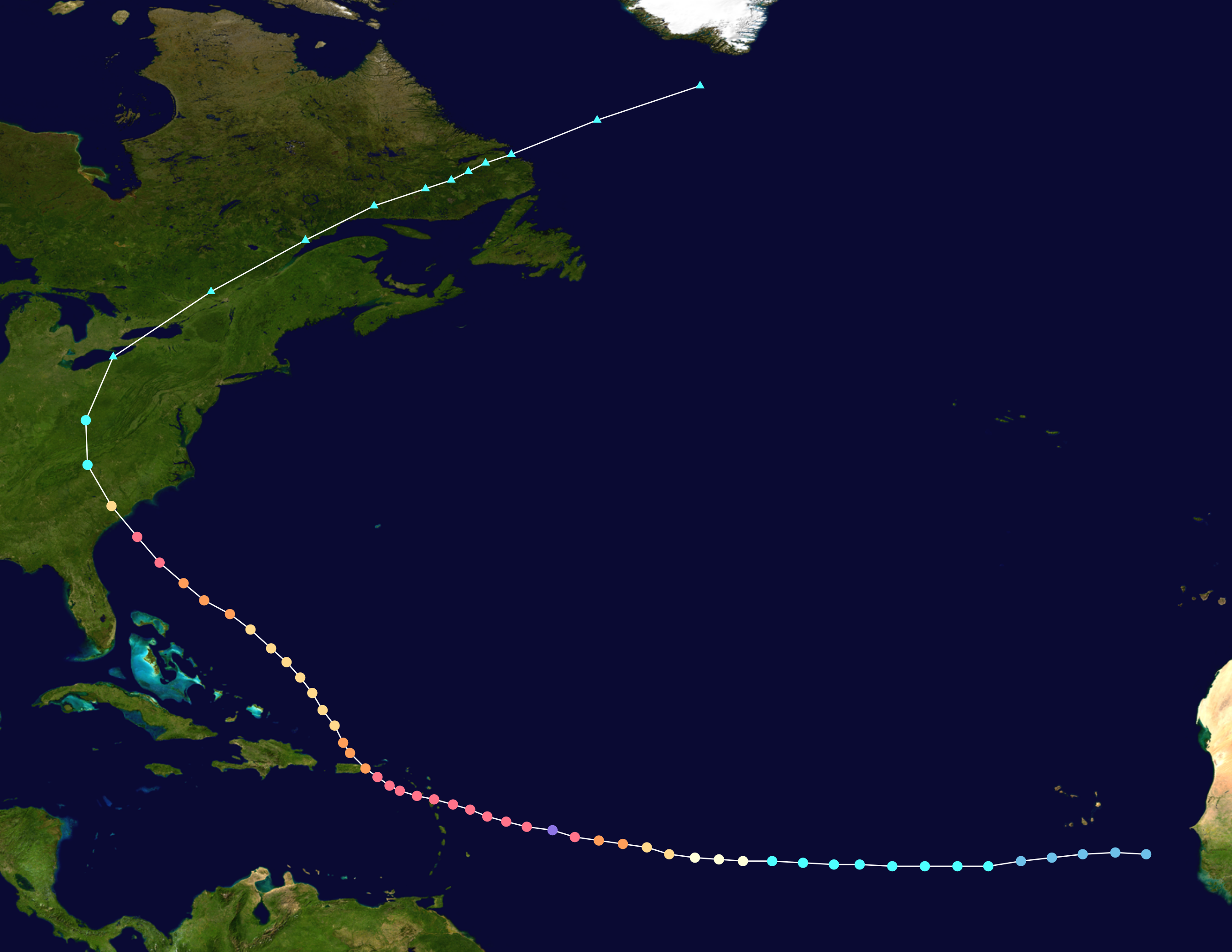
Map plotting the storm's track and intensity, according to the Saffir–Simpson scale Map key Saffir–Simpson scale Tropical depression (≤38 mph, ≤62 km/h) Tropical storm (39–73 mph, 63–118 km/h) Category 1 (74–95 mph, 119–153 km/h) Category 2 (96–110 mph, 154–177 km/h) Category 3 (111–129 mph, 178–208 km/h) Category 4 (130–156 mph, 209–251 km/h) Category 5 (≥157 mph, ≥252 km/h) Unknown Storm type Tropical cyclone Subtropical cyclone Extratropical cyclone, remnant low, tropical disturbance, or monsoon depression

Hurricane Hugo was a Cape Verde hurricane that developed from a cluster of thunderstorms associated with a tropical wave first observed moving off the coast of Africa on September 9, near Cape Verde. (part of that same wave would later spawn Hurricane Raymond in the eastern Pacific). A tropical depression developed from this disturbance roughly 125 mi (200 km) south of Cape Verde the following day. The nascent cyclone intensified as it tracked west along the 12th parallel north and across the tropical Atlantic Ocean, reaching tropical storm strength on September 11, and hurricane strength on September 13, while located about 1,265 mi (2,035 km) east of the Leeward Islands. The presence of another area of low-pressure north of Puerto Rico produced a gap in the Azores High, causing Hugo to then gradually turn towards the west-northwest with its forward speed decelerating. During this time, the hurricane continued to intensify. At 18:00 UTC on September 15, Hugo reached its peak intensity, with maximum sustained winds of 160 mph (260 km/h), making it a Category 5 hurricane, and a central barometric pressure of 918 mbar (27.11 inHg). Still several hundred miles east of the Leeward Islands at the time, this made Hugo the easternmost Category 5 hurricane on record in the Atlantic at that time. (Note: This record was eclipsed by Hurricane Lorenzo in 2019.) Between September 15 and September 22, aircraft reconnaissance from the U.S. Air Force (USAF) and National Oceanic and Atmospheric Administration (NOAA) penetrated the eye of Hugo 76 times, documenting the location of the storm's center roughly once every two hours. However, NOAA 42 nearly crashed on its first flight after hitting severe turbulence in the eyewall and experiencing an engine fire during the mission.

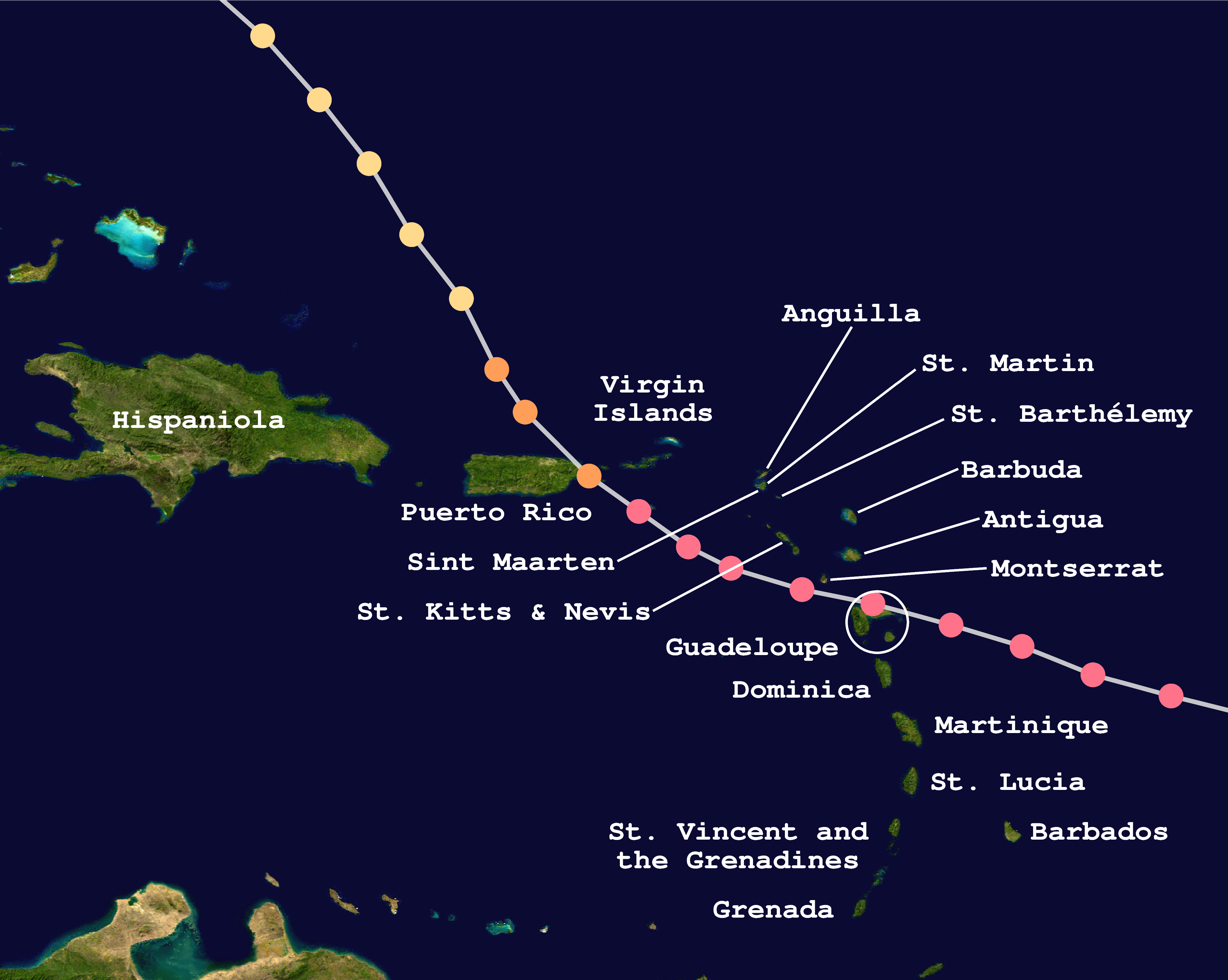
Hugo's path in the Caribbean

Hugo's winds tapered as it approached the Caribbean; at 05:00 UTC on September 17, Hugo's eye passed over Guadeloupe with sustained winds of 140 mph (220 km/h). The next day, the hurricane made three landfalls, first on Saint Croix in the U.S. Virgin Islands, with sustained winds of 140 mph (220 km/h), followed by Vieques and Fajardo in Puerto Rico, with sustained winds of 125 mph (205 km/h) in each instance. Hugo's encounter with Puerto Rico weakened the storm substantially, its eye became ill-defined in satellite imagery and its winds had diminished to around 105 mph (165 km/h) by 06:00 UTC on September 19. However, the hurricane's return to open waters provided suitable conditions for reintensification. By this juncture, the broader weather patterns that steered Hugo had changed: the Azores High became a dominant influence north of the hurricane and an upper-level low emerged over Georgia. These two features generated a strong southeasterly steering flow within which Hugo was contained, shaping its trajectory towards the Southeastern United States.

As the hurricane accelerated away from Puerto Rico at about 14 mph (22 km/h), it became better organized and its eye became increasingly well defined. On September 21, Hugo passed over the Gulf Stream and intensified markedly over a period of 30 hours, re-strengthening to a Category 4 hurricane. At 04:00 UTC on September 22, Hugo made its last landfall on Sullivan's Island, South Carolina, with sustained winds of 140 mph (220 km/h). Hugo's forward motion was beginning to accelerate northward at the time in response to an extratropical cyclone moving across the central U.S., and this curvature and acceleration continued as Hugo moved farther inland. The intensity of the winds decreased after landfall, particularly as Hugo began interacting with the Appalachian Mountains; by dawn on September 22, Hugo was downgraded to a tropical storm when it was just west of Charlotte, North Carolina. The next day, it transitioned into an extratropical storm near Erie, Pennsylvania, and continued across eastern Canada, eventually moving into the far northern Atlantic where it was last noted on September 25.

== Preparations ==
=== Watches and warnings ===
In the northeastern Caribbean, warnings issued by the NHC were disseminated by the six meteorological offices of the Caribbean Meteorological Council. The first hurricane watch was issued by the NHC at 09:00 UTC on September 15, covering much of the Lesser Antilles from Saint Lucia northward to the British Virgin Islands. The watch was escalated to a hurricane warning three hours later. Concurrent watches and warnings for tropical storm conditions were in effect for Saint Vincent and Barbados. These initial alerts were discontinued following the storm's passage by September 18. A hurricane watch was issued for Puerto Rico and the U.S. Virgin Islands on September 15; this was superseded by a hurricane warning the following day that in turn was lifted on September 19. As Hugo tracked northwest across the Sargasso Sea between September 19 and 20, tropical storm warnings were issued for coastal areas of the Dominican Republic and The Bahamas. The NHC first issued hurricane watches for portions of the East Coast of the United States on September 20, escalating to a hurricane warning for some coastal areas on September 21. The coverage of these watches and warnings were incrementally revised leading up to Hugo's final landfall; at their greatest extent, hurricane watches were in effect between St. Augustine, Florida, and the Chesapeake Bay, while hurricane warnings were in effect between Fernandina Beach, Florida, and Oregon Inlet in North Carolina. All tropical cyclone watches and warnings were discontinued by 16:00 UTC on September 22.

=== Caribbean ===
Barbados served as a staging area for disaster response in the Caribbean due to its strategic position in the region and distance away from Hugo's forecast impacts. Several relief agencies had convened in Barbados earlier in 1989 to coordinate hurricane response plans. These agencies were mobilized ahead of Hugo's arrival in the Lesser Antilles. They were joined by additional teams from the United States Agency for International Development and the U.S. Office of Foreign Disaster Assistance (OFDA). Additional relief teams from the OFDA, Pan American Health Organization, Red Cross, and United Nations Office of the United Nations Disaster Relief Coordinator were pre-positioned in Antigua to survey the damage and prioritize aid in Hugo's aftermath. The government of Dominica urged its citizens to take emergency precautions. The Dominican Ministry of Public Works prepositioned earthmoving equipment around Dominica to clear landslide debris. A curfew in Guadeloupe mandating that streets be clear of pedestrians and vehicles came into effect at 6 p.m. AST on September 17. Leading up to the curfew, residents rushed hardware stores and supermarkets to stock up on supplies. Many on the Atlantic-facing side of Guadeloupe evacuated farther inland. Cable television played a significant role in keeping residents of Martinique updated on the hurricane's approach. Though no formal evacuation order was enacted for Martinique, the prefect of Martinique recommended the evacuation of the low-lying Kinsale area on September 16. Twenty-four evacuation shelters were opened throughout the island. Disaster preparedness plans were set into motion by Martinique's government ministries, dispatching crews to board windows and secure buildings. Air France cancelled its three Martinique-bound flights from Paris scheduled for September 18; flights to the Lesser Antilles were largely cancelled by the afternoon of September 16. Most buildings in Antigua were shuttered by noon on September 17 and all local ships were brought to their moorings. V. C. Bird International Airport closed and the island's electric grid was turned off.

At least 30,000 people evacuated in Puerto Rico, making it one of the largest evacuations in the territory's history; government and media representatives described the evacuation as "the best coordinated weather event they could recall." Three thousand people evacuated from southeastern Puerto Rico and five thousand evacuated from San Juan neighborhoods. However, many were initially reluctant to leave. La Perla was evacuated for the first time in living memory. Hundreds of evacuees were brought to a stadium in Mayagüez. The Luis Muñoz Marín International Airport terminated all scheduled flights at 6 p.m. AST on September 17. All international airlines evacuated their aircraft from Puerto Rico, though one Airbus A300 owned by American Airlines was left behind for emergency use. Tourists left en masse on departing flights before the airport terminated operations. Cruise ships with San Juan as their port of call were rerouted elsewhere. One person was killed in Utuado, Puerto Rico, after being electrocuted by a power line while preparing for the storm. On September 18, Puerto Rican Governor Rafael Hernández Colón ordered a shutdown of the island's electric grid to mitigate damage. A state of emergency was declared in the Dominican Republic on September 18.

Buildings were boarded up in Nassau, Bahamas, and classes were cancelled at The College of The Bahamas on September 18.

=== Continental United States ===
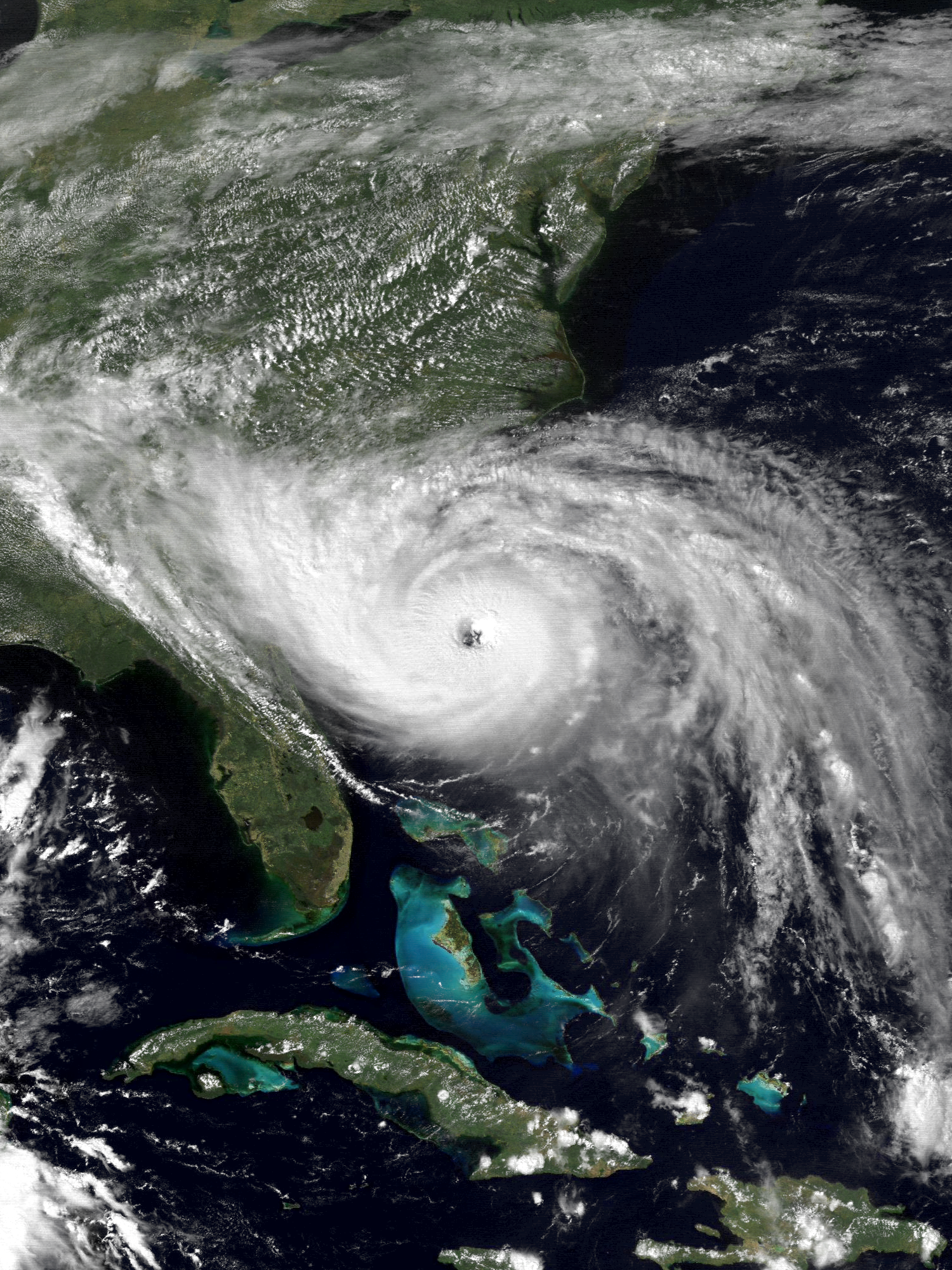
Satellite image of Hugo approaching South Carolina as a Category 4 hurricane on September 21

After Hugo departed the Caribbean, officials in South Florida convened on September 18 to discuss emergency preparedness plans, and some residents began to gather supplies. NHC director Bob Sheets stated that if Hugo were to reach the United States, it could move ashore "anywhere from the Florida Keys to North Carolina." NASA delayed the September 22 launch of an Atlas-Centaur rocket with Hugo looming. Boats were moved from coastal marinas to more protected harbors inland near St. Simons, Georgia. The American Red Cross readied 58 shelters in Miami, Florida, and 23 shelters in Fort Lauderdale, Florida. Equipment was prepositioned throughout Myrtle Beach, South Carolina, to expedite cleanup operations. The mayor of Charleston, Joseph P. Riley Jr., called Hugo "an extraordinarily dangerous event, [...] the likes of which few people who have lived all their lives in Charleston have experienced." Twenty U.S. Navy ships and submarines were moved out of Charleston to weather the storm at sea. The New Georgia Railroad between Atlanta and Savannah, Georgia, halted operations, affecting 400 passengers.

The hurricane watch for the Carolinas was issued 30 hours before Hugo's landfall. Charleston County, South Carolina, officials began recommending evacuations on the evening of September 20; this was later changed to an evacuation order. Beaufort County, South Carolina, declared a state of emergency on September 20 and implemented voluntary evacuations. Carroll A. Campbell Jr., the Governor of South Carolina, issued a voluntary evacuation order before the coast was placed under a hurricane warning, with the initial directive intended for barrier islands, beaches, and peninsulas outside Charleston. This was later supplanted by a mandatory evacuation order. Governor Campbell ordered eight coastal counties to open shelters; of these shelters, 20 were opened in Charleston County. Four hundred troops from the National Guard were activated to assist in evacuations along the coast. A total of 264,000 people were evacuated in South Carolina; most took shelter in the homes of friends or relatives, and relatively few sought refuge in public shelters. A fifth of evacuees took refuge within 30 minutes of their homes. An estimated 96 percent of people on the high-risk barrier islands and beaches evacuated, while 75–80 percent of people in moderate-risk areas evacuated. Most did not evacuate until after the hurricane warning and mandatory evacuation order were issued. Accurate forecasts from the NHC and the resulting narrow scope of evacuations allowed the evacuations to "[proceed] as smoothly as could be expected", and contraflow traffic patterns were not required for those departing Charleston via Interstate 26. Parts of the Georgia and North Carolina coasts also evacuated ahead of Hugo. Georgia enacted a full evacuation, with 175,000 leaving their homes and 6,000 moving to public shelters. Civil authorities in Glynn County, Georgia, urged the 15,000 residents along barrier islands to begin evacuating on the morning of September 21 ahead of hurricane warnings. Public schools were closed in Chatham County, Georgia, to allocate school buses for the evacuation of barrier islands. Three shelters were opened in North Carolina, though emergency management did not anticipate ordering evacuations.

== Impact ==
Direct impact by country or region (Note: This tabulation only includes direct fatalities associated with the hurricane's forces.)
Country	Deaths	Damage
Antigua and Barbuda	2	$200 million
British Virgin Islands	—	$50 million
Dominica	—	$20 million
Guadeloupe	11	$880 million
Montserrat	10	$260 million
Netherlands Antilles	11	$50 million
Puerto Rico	8	$2 billion
St. Kitts and Nevis	1	$46 million
Contiguous United States	21	$7 billion
U.S. Virgin Islands	3	$500 million

=== Caribbean ===
Hugo was the strongest storm to traverse the northeastern Caribbean since Hurricane David in 1979. The Sea, Lake, and Overland Surge from Hurricanes (SLOSH) model estimated that storm surge from Hugo led to coastal water levels 3–4 ft (0.91–1.22 m) above normal tidal heights along Saint Croix and the eastern end of Puerto Rico. These equated to storm surge heights of around 7–8 ft (2.1–2.4 m). Water levels of 2–3 ft (0.61–0.91 m) above normal were estimated to have occurred along the northern coast of Puerto Rico. Rainfall on the Caribbean islands averaged between 5 and 10 in (130 and 250 mm). The NHC's preliminary report on the hurricane enumerated 28 fatalities in the eastern Caribbean while media reports tallied over 30. As many as 100,000 people may have been left homeless throughout the region as a result of Hugo.

Guadeloupe and Montserrat were hardest-hit among the Leeward Islands, and collectively suffered over $1 billion in damage and recorded 21 fatalities. Though less severe, widespread damage was also inflicted by Hugo across the remainder of the Leeward and Windward Islands. Extensive flooding occurred on Antigua, and power outages befell the island after utility poles were uprooted by the storm. There were 2 deaths and 181 injuries. Another 509 people were left homeless following damage wrought to 15 percent of homes. Partial damage was documented on 1,500 homes and total loss was documented on 106. Thirty percent of fishing vessels were also damaged by the hurricane, equating to thousands of boats. The total cost of damage reached nearly EC$200 million. Hugo's damage toll in Saint Kitts and Nevis amounted to $46 million, largely sustained by shoreline structures and crops. This equated to 32 percent of the country's gross domestic product. Homes, government buildings, and trees were damaged by the storm. A fifth of the country was rendered homeless and the entire populace lost power and water. Ninety percent of the residents of Nevis lost their homes. One person was killed after a wall collapsed upon him.

Dominica was most affected among the Windward Islands. Hugo ruined 80 percent of the island's banana crop and interrupted water supplies. Coastal roads were damaged by the hurricane's choppy seas; a washout along a primary thoroughfare isolated the village of Dubique. Bridges and storm drains also took heavy damage. Landslides isolated towns for many days. The damage toll in Dominica totaled $20 million.

The hurricane moved near the Virgin Islands and made two landfalls in Puerto Rico as it egressed the Caribbean, causing considerable destruction. Estimates of the damage toll in this region vary but include over $50 million each for the British Virgin Islands and Netherlands Antilles, $2 billion for Puerto Rico, and $500 million for Saint Croix. Hugo's center was 85 mi (137 km) southwest of Sint Maarten at its closest approach; a station there reported a maximum sustained wind 46 mph (74 km/h) and a peak gust of 78 mph (126 km/h). Eleven people were killed in the Netherlands Antilles and caused $50 million in damage there. The damage toll in the British Virgin Islands exceeded $50 million, with the loss of at least half of the islands' agriculture. Around 30 percent of homes were unroofed. Power outages affected the British Virgin Islands. The Associated Press reported "numerous injuries" and "scores of homes destroyed" on Tortola, the largest island in the BVI. A third of the island's private homes were wrecked. The hurricane also caused widespread power outages in the Dominican Republic while tracking northwest towards the continental United States.

=== Contiguous United States ===
Hugo was the costliest hurricane in U.S. history at the time and one of its costliest disasters overall, with a damage toll of $8 billion estimated by the NHC. This total was over three times higher than that inflicted by Hurricane Frederic, the previous costliest hurricane. (Note: This figure does not account for inflation.) The State, a South Carolina newspaper, estimated that the U.S. incurred $8.671 billion in damage from Hugo, with $7.071 billion in the contiguous U.S. and $1.6 billion in Puerto Rico and the U.S. Virgin Islands. The San Juan Star, a Puerto Rican newspaper, calculated that losses in Puerto Rico amounted to $2 billion. Insured property damage in the contiguous U.S. reached $3.042 billion according to the American Insurance Association, with another $1.881 billion in Puerto Rico and the U.S. Virgin Islands. Although the most heavily impacted areas had relatively low population, Hugo moved over heavily forested areas; this was unusual for a hurricane striking the United States, and led to significant secondary damage from falling trees. Hugo was also the most powerful storm to strike the country since Hurricane Camille in 1969.

In addition to the rain, surge, and wind associated with Hugo, the National Severe Storms Forecast Center received unconfirmed reports of tornadoes produced by Hugo in South Carolina and west-central North Carolina, though it was difficult to differentiate tornadic damage from the broader-swaths of wind damage caused by the hurricane. There were 26 fatalities in the United States attributed directly to the weather conditions produced by Hugo; among the country's states and territories, South Carolina had the highest death toll with 13 direct fatalities. The American Red Cross enumerated 70 fatalities in the Carolinas, Puerto Rico, and the U.S. Virgin Islands both directly and indirectly caused by Hugo. The homes of more than 200,000 families nationwide were damaged or destroyed; 129,687 families were affected in the Carolinas and 87,700 families were affected in Puerto Rico and the U.S. Virgin Islands.

==== South Carolina ====
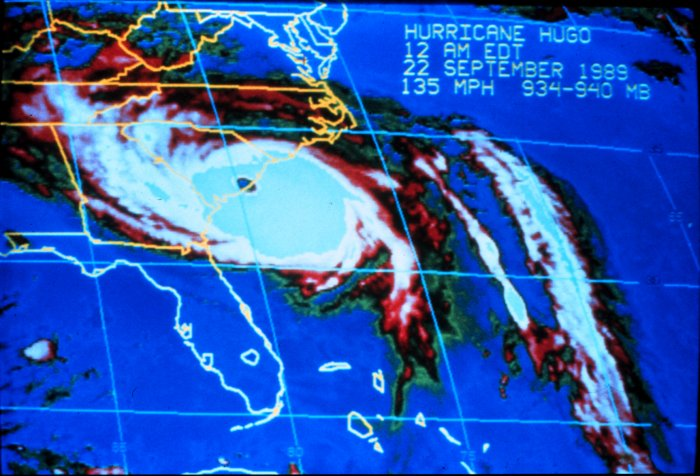
Hugo making landfall on South Carolina early on September 22

The eye of Hugo moved ashore South Carolina at Sullivan's Island at 04:00 UTC on September 22 (12:00 a.m. EDT). The storm's maximum sustained winds were estimated by the NHC to have reached 140 mph (230 km/h) during landfall, making Hugo a Category 4 hurricane. This estimate was derived from an aircraft reconnaissance flight into the storm shortly before landfall; no weather stations were positioned along Bulls Bay, where Hugo's strongest winds likely occurred. This intensity made Hugo the strongest hurricane to strike the United States in 20 years. The ship Snow Goose, anchored in the Sampit River 5 mi (8.0 km) west of Georgetown, clocked a 120-mile-per-hour (193 km/h) sustained wind using an anemometer mounted on the ship's mast. In downtown Charleston, a sustained wind of 87 mph (140 km/h) and a gust of 108 mph (174 km/h) were reported. Hugo produced an 8-foot (2.4 m) storm surge at Charleston, indicating that water levels rose 12.9 ft (3.9 m) above mean lower low water as Hugo made landfall. Elsewhere along the South Carolina coast, Hugo produced storm tides as high as 20 ft (6.1 m). The maximum recorded storm surge was 20.2 ft (6.2 m) along Seewee Bay south of McClellanville. This rise in water induced by Hugo resulted in the highest storm tides ever recorded along the U.S. East Coast. Between 3 and 8 in (76 and 203 mm) of rain fell across a swath 150 mi (240 km) wide over South Carolina. The maximum rainfall in the state (and the continental United States) was 10.28 in (261 mm) as measured in Edisto Island. Totals between 4 and 6 in (100 and 150 mm) were commonplace along the coast of South Carolina.

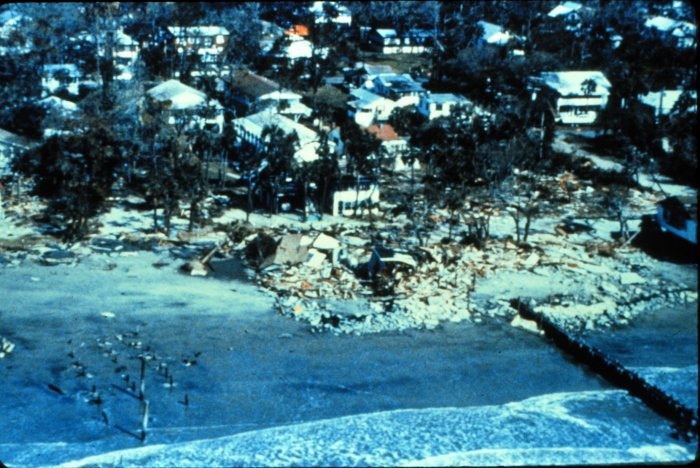
Damaged beachfront property in South Carolina

The South Carolina Electric and Gas Company (SCE&G) called Hugo "the single greatest natural disaster ever to strike the state", inflicting $5.9 billion in property damage. The hurricane's trajectory swept across three major South Carolina cities. According to the National Oceanic and Atmospheric Administration's Storm Data publication, there were 35 deaths associated with Hugo in South Carolina. The hurricane's forces killed 13 people while another 22 fatalities were considered "indirectly-related". Among the indirect fatalities were two people killed by house fires started by candles during the storm. Another 420 people were injured throughout the state. The Red Cross documented the destruction of 3,307 single-family homes and "major damage" to another 18,171. Across eight counties, manufacturers incurred $158 million in damage to factories and $750 million in inventory and income losses. Much of the South Carolina coast was subject to the ferocity of the hurricane's forces. Hugo's storm surge wrecked the barrier islands, thoroughly razing many structures. Many homes on Wadmalaw Island and Johns Island were crushed by fallen trees. The Ben Sawyer Bridge connecting the South Carolina mainland to Sullivan's Island was heavily damaged and became stuck in an open position. Rows of beachfront homes on Sullivan's Island were razed by the surge. Ships at the marina in Isle of Palms were crumpled into a heap on the mainland shore. Beach homes on Isle of Palms were moved 150 ft (46 m) off their foundations by an 11-foot (3.4 m) storm surge; in total, 60 homes were destroyed on the island. The damage in Sullivan's Island and Isle of Palms combined was estimated to be approximately $270 million. Every building on the two islands took damage from the hurricane. Storm surge tore off the pavement from coastal roads and destroyed 80 percent at Folly Beach. All coastal state parks with the exception of Hunting Island and Edisto Beach sustained significant damage.

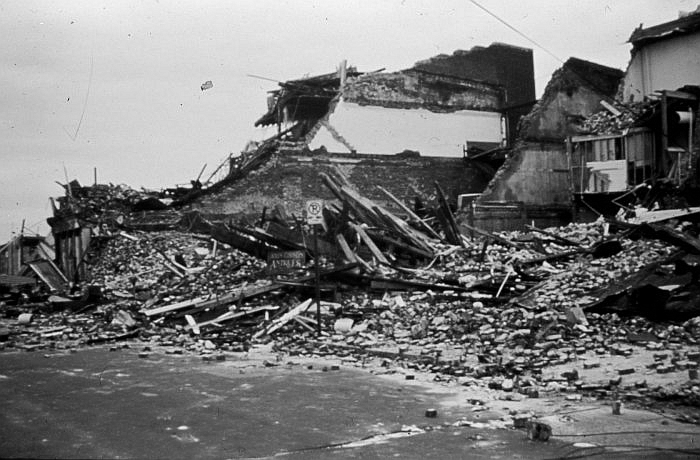
Charleston was heavily impacted by Hugo

Charleston County was at the epicenter of Hugo's devastation. At McClellanville, near the point of maximum storm surge, shrimp boats were pushed as far as 0.5 mi (0.80 km) inland. Commercial and recreational craft damaged other structures as they were carried ashore. A high school used as a shelter for 1,125 local residents was inundated by the ocean's advance; documentation had listed its elevation 11 ft (3.4 m) too high, leading to its mistaken selection as a shelter. The storm surge accumulated within the Ashley, Cooper, and Santee rivers, forcing them over their banks and submerging low-lying areas 10 mi (16 km) upstream. One person was killed by the rise of the Cooper River at Mount Pleasant. Seven to eight hundred boats were left in derelict condition, and many in Shem Creek capsized. Hugo's surge spilled over The Battery and overtook the first floors of homes in downtown Charleston. Eighty percent of roofs in the city were damaged, with many already susceptible to strong winds due to poor maintenance and weak structural integrity. At least 3,200 historic structures in Charleston were damaged and 95 percent of urban trees were lost. Naval Weapons Station Charleston sustained $95–$100 million in damage. Two people were killed in Charleston by the collapse of their homes. The U.S. Route 17 bridge across Awendaw Creek in Awendaw was destroyed by a 19.4 ft (5.9 m) storm tide. Extensive losses to timber occurred at Francis Marion National Forest, where 75 percent of marketable trees were felled. Most trees were truncated 10–25 ft (3.0–7.6 m) above the ground, with others snapped or uprooted; the cost of damage was estimated by the U.S. Forest Service at between $95 and 115 million. Animals, including some from endangered species, were killed at Cape Romain National Wildlife Refuge. However, the lack of infrastructure near the refuge significantly reduced the damage wrought by Hugo's strongest winds.

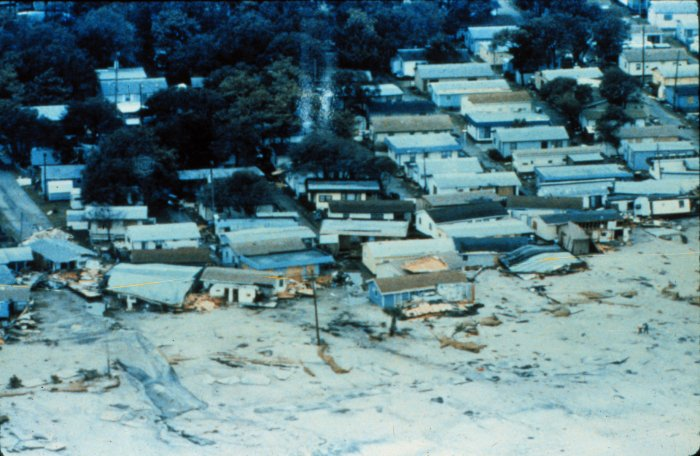
Wrecked mobile homes along the South Carolina coast

Coastal impacts in South Carolina were extensive beyond Charleston County. The waterfront in Georgetown suffered heavily, with the destruction of 150 homes. Major damage was inflicted upon 350 homes and minor damage was inflicted upon another 500 homes, with their aggregate losses amounting to $87 million. Farms and businesses around Georgetown sustained $10 million in damage. Only a few beachfront homes withstood the hurricane in Pawleys Island. Debris from destroyed homes piled atop streets along the island's south end. Hugo caused about $944 million in damage in Horry County. As protective sand dunes were whittled down by the hurricane, beaches along 150 mi (240 km) of the coastal Carolinas recessed 50–200 ft (15–61 m) inland. Beaches were eroded by a 13-foot (4.0 m) surge up to the most outward row of homes in Garden City. These coastal homes were razed or washed inland, dealing damage to additional homes. M. L. Love, the administrator for Horry County, said that the city "for all practical purposes is gone." Severe beach erosion also occurred in Myrtle Beach and North Myrtle Beach. Piers along the coast of Horry County were heavily damaged by storm surge. The pier at Sunset Beach was reduced to its pilings. Myrtle Beach Air Force Base sustained $2 million in damage from buildings and equipment. With the Grand Strand and Myrtle Beach areas experiencing only low-end hurricane-force winds, the widespread wind damage in those areas was attributed to "widespread underdesign and marginal building practices." Lesser damage occurred along the southern South Carolina coast between Charleston, South Carolina, and Savannah, Georgia, with winds there remaining below 65 mph (105 km/h).

Hugo's acceleration at landfall allowed strong winds to penetrate well inland, causing widespread wind damage across the eastern two-thirds of the state. The NOAA classified wind damage as "extensive" in 15 counties. Devastated groves of pine trees were characteristic of the hurricane's impacts, in addition to numerous unroofed homes and cotton crops injured by the winds and rain. Over one-third of all timber in the state was damaged, with the damage most extensive near the coast and locations that were northeast of Hugo's eye as it moved across the state. This quantity of timber was enough to build 660,000 homes. The total stock of growing softwood was cut by 21 percent while the total stock of growing hardwood fell by 6 percent. Hugo was widely considered the most significant forest disaster in South Carolina history. Across 23 counties, 4.4 million acres (1.8 million hectares) experienced the loss of 6.6 million board feet (15,600 m^{3}) of timber, equivalent to three to four times the annual timber harvest; this was a greater loss of timber than observed in Hurricane Camille, the 1980 eruption of Mount St. Helens, and the Yellowstone fires of 1988, combined. Berkeley, Clarendon, Florence, Lee, Sumter, and Williamsburg counties each experienced damage to more than 90 percent of timberland. A conservative estimate valued the lost timber statewide at $1.04 billion. Downed trees and wind-blown debris severed power lines, cutting power for most areas. Three power plants were also disabled by the storm. SCE&G reported that 300,000 of its electricity customers lost power, with a complete loss of power east of Interstate 95. Utility services from the South Carolina Public Service Authority were crippled for 99 percent of the utility's customers. At Shaw Air Force Base near Sumter, 200 homes were destroyed and 1,000 sustained heavy damage; the property damage toll for Sumter County was $237 million. The effects of Hugo in the Carolinas were most fatal in Berkeley County, where eight people were killed. Over a thousand homes and apartments were destroyed and 70–80 percent of the county's trees were blown down. Up to a quarter of York County's cotton crop was lost, with additional losses suffered by peach, sorghum, and soybean crops.

==== North Carolina ====
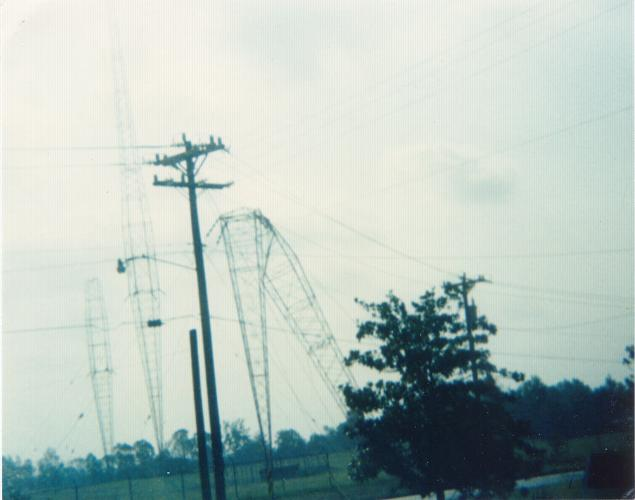
The damaged transmitter towers of AM radio station WBT near Charlotte, North Carolina

Across North Carolina, Hugo damaged 2,638 structures and destroyed 205; the damage toll was $1 billion. Losses to crops and livestock amounted to nearly $97 million. There were seven fatalities in the state. Storm surge along the coast of North Carolina west of Cape Fear reached 9 ft (2.7 m) above mean sea level. Three beach communities in Brunswick County, North Carolina, incurred a total of $55 million in damage; with at least 25 beachfront homes battered by the storm; another 100 structures were threatened by coastal erosion. Along parts of the coast, 50 ft (15 m) of beach eroded, including sand dunes that once stood 7–8 ft (2.1–2.4 m) tall. Sixty percent of the sand dunes in Long Beach were eliminated by the hurricane, further exposing areas inland to the storm's fury. Several piers were wrecked by Hugo: the pier at Yaupon Beach was destroyed while a fourth of the pier at Long Beach was lost; the end of the pier at Holden Beach also succumbed to the storm.

With the aid of Hugo's rapid forward motion, the swath of damaging winds produced by Hugo in interior South Carolina penetrated into western North Carolina while still a category 1 hurricane and brought extensive damage to areas that rarely experienced impacts from tropical cyclones. Hugo produced a nearly 50-mile-wide (80-kilometer) corridor of downed trees and power lines west of Charlotte, and hurricane-force wind gusts extended 200 mi (320 km) inland. The control tower at Charlotte Douglas International Airport clocked a 99 mph (159 km/h) gust, forcing personnel in the airport's control tower to evacuate. Windows were blown out of skyscrapers in Uptown Charlotte. The 400-foot (120 m) tall WSOC-TV antenna collapsed onto the television station below. Numerous trees in Charlotte were also blown down atop homes and power lines, triggering long-lasting power outages that affected 85 percent of Charlotte homes and businesses. A six-month-old boy was killed after a tree toppled onto his mobile home; another 15 people were injured, primarily by falling trees. The winds piled boats together and destroyed or damaged thousands of them in Lake Norman, located north of Charlotte. Wind damage in Mecklenburg County amounted to over $500 million. Millions of trees were felled across the Foothills and Piedmont of North Carolina; some areas endured the resulting power outages for weeks. The National Weather Service office in Wilmington described Hugo's winds as a "unique event in weather history for this portion of inland North Carolina."

==== Virginia ====
Parts of Southwest Virginia were also impacted by the core of strong winds associated with Hugo, which passed through the state as a tropical storm. Bath and Bland counties registered 81-mph (130 km/h) gusts; these were the fastest gusts measured in Virginia in connection with the passing storm. As was the case in North Carolina, the winds downed numerous trees, causing widespread power outages and structural damage. Their arboreal debris obstructed hundreds of roads. Sporadic damage from Hugo occurred as far east as Interstate 95. The damage toll in Virginia was approximately $60 million, with over $40 million incurred in Carroll and Grayson County, Virginia counties; six people were killed statewide.

While Hugo's quick traversal of the Southeastern U.S. enlarged the area of inland wind damage, it also attenuated rainfall totals; rainfall was relatively light for a storm of Hugo's size. In southwestern Virginia and western North Carolina, the topography of the Appalachian Mountains led to a localized area of heavier rainfalls, resulting in 6 in (150 mm) rainfall totals. While Hugo's rainfall was not sufficient to cause major river flooding in North Carolina, minor flooding impacted mountainous areas north and east of Asheville and highways in seven counties. A nursing home in Boone, North Carolina, was evacuated following a flash flood. In Burnsville, North Carolina, flooding prompted the evacuation of 79 prisoners. Rainfall totals of 1–4 in (25–102 mm) occurred throughout southwestern Virginia, with a maximum of 6.5 in (170 mm) in Hillsville, Virginia. Some low-lying areas and streams flooded, including the New and Roanoke rivers; flooding along the South Fork of the Roanoke forced about 60 people to evacuate.

==== Elsewhere ====
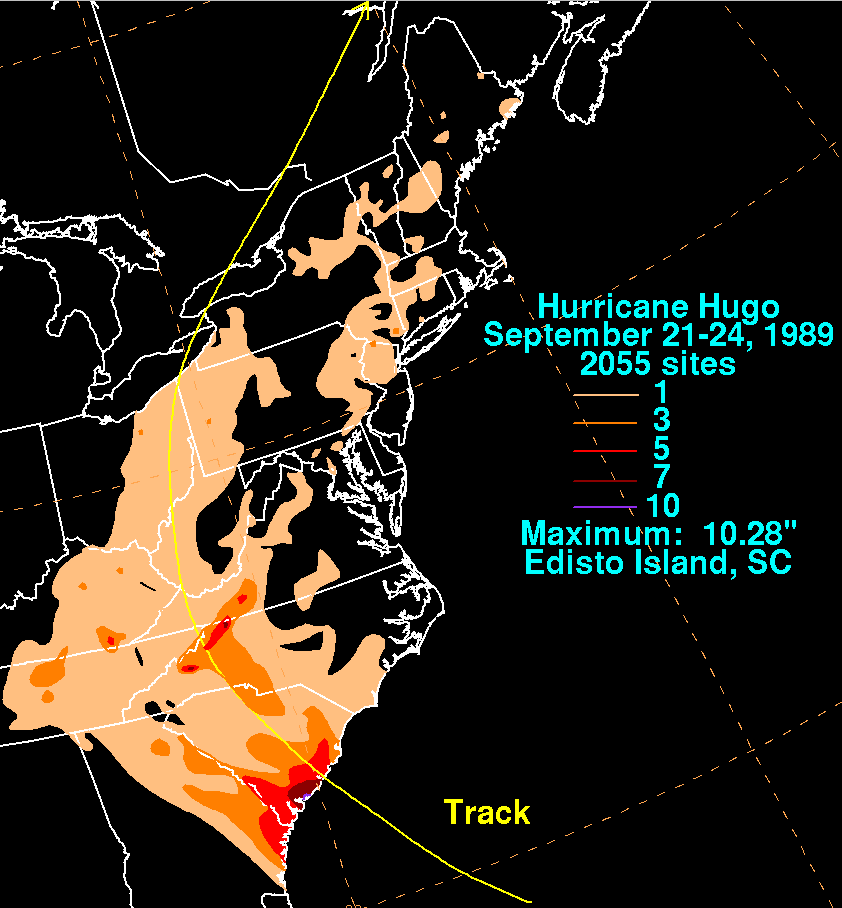
Rainfall from Hugo spread across the northeastern United States along its track inland

Strong winds in Georgia downed trees in four counties, damaging homes and power lines. About 50–75 trees were toppled around Savannah, where wind gusts reached 54 mph (87 km/h). The city's weather service office recorded 6.10 in (155 mm) of rain. Winds of 45–50 mph (72–80 km/h) downed trees in Mercer County, West Virginia. Flooding forced the evacuation of the Oakdale area in Harrison County, West Virginia. Widespread flash flooding occurred across eastern Tennessee, forcing the evacuation of people from affected areas; some of the evacuees had fled South Carolina for the Great Smoky Mountains. Three hundred people were driven out of Carter County. Floods there swamped homes and the downtown area of Roan Mountain. Bridges and roads were washed out in Greene and Johnson counties. Numerous creeks overflowed their banks in northeastern Ohio following heavy rainfall from the remnants of Hugo on the afternoon of September 22. In both Chardon and Medina, 4.3 in (110 mm) of rain fell in two hours. Floodwaters inundated urban areas and basements. In the eastern suburbs of Cleveland, flooding overtook cars and buses. High water and washouts forced the closure of U.S. Route 42 and Ohio State Route 94 in Medina County.

The juxtaposition of Hugo's extratropical remnants (a low-pressure system) over the eastern Great Lakes region and a strong high-pressure system off the U.S. East Coast generated a sharp contrast in pressure. This led to strong winds over the Mid-Atlantic states and New England. Nearly 85,000 homes and businesses lost power on Long Island. One person was killed in Norwich, New York, after a falling tree struck the car he was in. Fifteen counties in Pennsylvania reported high winds in connection with Hugo, with some sustaining damage to trees. Connecticut was buffeted with winds of 40–50 mph (64–80 km/h), blowing down some trees and branches. This led to scattered and brief power outages that affected 30,000 electricity customers. Total property and crop damage in Connecticut amounted to at least $50,000. Power outages also affected thousands of electricity customers in Massachusetts. Fallen trees and broken limbs caused scattered property damage throughout the state. In western parts of Massachusetts, some apple orchards reported damage to as much as 30 percent of their crops. In Vermont, the high winds generated swells several feet high on Lake Champlain, freeing some boats from their moorings. Trees and power lines were also brought down by the winds statewide.

=== Canada ===
After becoming extratropical, the remnants of Hugo entered Canada into the province of Ontario. In the Niagara Falls area, winds between 37 and 43 mph (60 and 69 km/h) were reported. Winds near 47 mph (76 km/h) were also reported in Toronto. Heavy rainfall also occurred in Ontario, with precipitation in Ontario peaking at 4.5 in (110 mm), while a maximum amount of 1.85 in (47 mm) was reported in Toronto. As a result of the storm, blackouts and car accidents were reported in Toronto. Furthermore, heavy rains and high winds also occurred across the southern portions of Ontario.

The remnants of Hugo tracked northeastward and entered the Canadian province of Quebec. In Montreal, rainfall reached only 0.43 in (11 mm), while precipitation amounts in the province peaked at 3.73 in (95 mm). In addition to light rain, high winds were reported in the province. Winds in Montreal gusted up to 59 mph (95 km/h), leaving 13,400 homes without electricity. 7,400 residence in Verdun and West Island also lost electricity when tree fell on power lines; it was restored about 12 hours later. While in Brossard and Chambly, power was lost to 5,000 homes and 1,000 homes in Valleyfield. In addition, high winds and heavy rainfall also occurred in the St. Lawrence River Valley.

Similar effects were reported in New Brunswick, though little rainfall occurred in the province. Winds gusting to 77 mph (124 km/h) was reported in Moncton. As a result of high winds, power poles were toppled and tree branches fell, which caused most of New Brunswick's 15,000 power failures. In addition, several tree and signs were blown over in Saint John and Moncton. The storm also significantly affected the apple crop in New Brunswick. Strong winds were also reported in Newfoundland, with gusts recorded up to 43 mph (69 km/h).

== Aftermath ==
=== Caribbean ===
==== Lesser Antilles ====
A plane bearing 60 rescue workers and emergency supplies was sent to Guadeloupe from Paris on September 19, with two more relief aircraft held on standby. The crews were tasked with sheltering the homeless, restoring electricity service, and clearing roads. Doctors were also sent to Guadeloupe from La Meynard Hospital in Martinique. Emergency supplies from Paris were gathered by Catholic Air and Red Cross. Military aircraft delivered 50 tons (45 tonnes) of supplies and over 500 emergency workers to Guadeloupe, along with Minister of Overseas France Louis Le Pensec; 3,000 soldiers also accompanied the transport. The total cost of repairs on the island was estimated at over €610 million. Two days after Hugo's passage, an Aérospatiale SA 330 Puma rescue helicopter crashed in La Désirade, killing nine people. The Guadeloupe government held a competition to design homes that would be quickly built to house the island's homeless population; five of thirty models were selected, and the first homes were built five months after Hugo. The banana industry in Guadeloupe required FF466 million to recover, while the island's hotel industry suffered FF152 million in losses.

The emergency operations center in Montserrat was formally activated on September 18 to effectively deal with the aftermath of Hugo. As more robust communication systems were destroyed by the storm, communications between the island and the outside world were primarily handled by amateur radio. Urgent requests for aid were forwarded by ham radio operators to all embassies and foreign missions in Barbados. The island's reduced radio capabilities were augmented by HMS Alacrity when she arrived in Plymouth on September 18. The ship also brought a helicopter and a crew of 100 sailors that aided in cleaning up roads between Plymouth and W. H. Bramble Airport. Extensive effort was required to clean up Montserrat's roads due to the prevalence of debris. Along with the crew of the Alacrity, the Barbados Defence Force and Jamaica Defence Force also assisted in road cleanup operations in Montserrat. The International Rescue Corps maintained a satellite communications link and provided support for 21 national and international organizations in recovery efforts. Rationing on petroleum was enforced, with a limit of four gallons (15 liters) per person. Waterborne illnesses in Hugo's aftermath proved fatal in Montserrat. A temporary hospital was established at the Montserrat Government House following the destruction of a recently completed hospital.

==== United States Virgin Islands ====
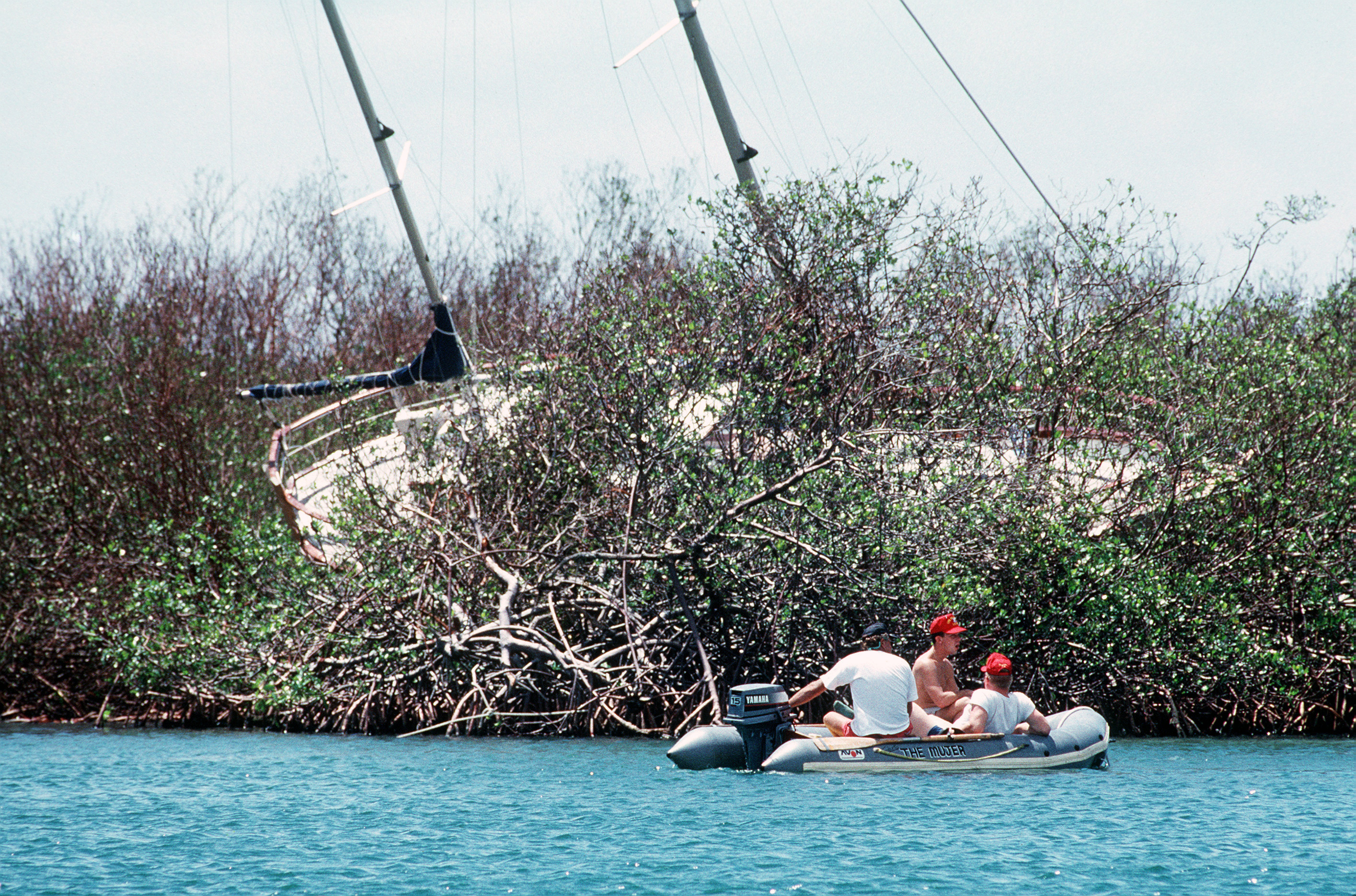
Relief crews attending a beached sailboat in Saint Croix

President Bush declared the U.S. Virgin Islands a disaster area. A temporary air traffic control tower was erected at Alexander Hamilton Airport in Saint Croix six days after the storm. Cyril E. King Airport in Saint Thomas, having suffered less damage, resumed operations within 24 hours. Power was restored in most of Saint Croix and Saint Thomas within three months. The islands' telephone systems were badly crippled by the storm, and only limited service was restored to businesses in December 1989. Some private residences in Saint Croix remained without telephone service until March 1990. In addition to the telephone outage, local CBS affiliate WBNB-TV was knocked off the air due to the transmitter being damaged. With no finances to rebuild, the temporary outage would become permanent, with no over the air CBS presence for some time. Between 300 and 500 prisoners were freed from prison in Saint Croix after the storm, either by escaping or by release due to food and water shortages in the prison. The Federal Emergency Management Agency (FEMA) dispatched a C-141 airlifter with government relief workers and communications equipment to Saint Croix. The demographics of the Virgin Islands a year after Hugo reflected the hurricane's impact: roughly 10% of Saint Croix's populace did not return to the island within a year of Hugo. A smaller exodus occurred at Saint Thomas and Saint John.

Three days after the storm hit, the Governor of the United States Virgin Islands Alexander Farrelly asked President Bush for federal assistance in restoring order to the island. On the island of Saint Croix, looting and lawlessness reigned in the aftermath of Hugo. FBI agents, U.S. marshals, and local police initially maintained a patrol of Frederiksted and Christiansted while the U.S. Coast Guard evacuated tourists from the island; the USCGC Bear evacuated 40 people and sent personnel onshore to monitor the situation. However, local law enforcement in Saint Croix was unable to stop widespread looting, with armed gangs reportedly taking root the streets of Christiansted. The Atlanta Constitution reported that some members of the local police and National Guard also took part in looting. For the first time since the Baltimore riot of 1968, American troops were deployed in response to a domestic civil disturbance; with the authorization of U.S. President George H. W. Bush under the Insurrection Act of 1807, the Pentagon sent 1,100 troops and federal marshals to augment the security presence as local police and the National Guard lost control of the situation. Among the deployments were 470 troops from the 16th Military Police Brigade, 560 troops from the 503rd Military Police Battalion, and three helicopters and medical support. Dubbed Operation Hawkeye, the operation involved elements of the Army, Navy and the Coast Guard, along with a contingent from the U.S. Marshals Service and the FBI, forming Joint Task Force (JTF) 40 for Operation Hawkeye. It also resulted in the first operational deployment of the National Disaster Medical System (NDMS), when the New Mexico-1 Disaster Medical Assistance Team (DMAT) was deployed to assist in medical care needs of the stricken island. The first contingent arrived in Saint Croix on the morning of September 21 to secure an airfield and devise the command structure for the other arriving troops.

National Basketball Association player Tim Duncan, born in Christiansted and a two-time NBA MVP, of the San Antonio Spurs attributed his basketball career to Hurricane Hugo's destruction. When Tim was 13 years old, he was a competitive swimmer who was considered one of the top United States competitors for the 400-meter freestyle. However, in the aftermath of Hugo, every swimming pool on Saint Croix was destroyed, including the Olympic-size swimming pool. With no pool to practice in, Duncan turned to basketball. Tim Duncan said, "I'm very fortunate to be where I am today. Without Hugo, I might still be swimming." On April 4, 2020, it was announced that Duncan would be inducted into the Naismith Memorial Basketball Hall of Fame on August 29.

==== Puerto Rico ====
Puerto Rican Governor Hernandez Colón solicited a disaster declaration for Puerto Rico from President Bush after surveying the damage wrought by Hugo. The U.S. Department of the Interior allocated $500,000 in aid to Puerto Rico and the U.S. Virgin Islands. Police were dispatched to retail areas, offices of political parties, and the main San Juan post office to avert looting. An emergency clinic served in place of the destroyed hospital in Culebra. Governor Colón estimated that the number of those displaced by Hugo in Puerto Rico exceeded 50,000. Over 25,000 people in Culebra and Vieques remained in shelters after Hugo as their homes were destroyed. The Puerto Rican school system was hindered by the damage inflicted on the schools themselves, their use as shelters, and the loss of water and power service. Due to a lack of planning for housing shelter residents, 500 schools remained closed weeks after the storm, affecting at least 150,000 students. The loss of water caused two hospitals to refuse patient admission on September 20.

While power in San Juan was largely restored within 48 hours, many in Puerto Rico remained without power in the days following Hugo. On September 24, 47,500 businesses and homes in Puerto Rico were without power; the San Juan Star reported that a quarter of electricity customers in Fajardo remained without electric service on October 9, three weeks after Hugo struck the island. Residents of Puerto Rico's northeastern coast were encouraged to boil water to curtail the spread of food- and waterborne diseases, though power outages prevented most from doing so. Repair costs for Puerto Rico Electric Power Authority poles and wires amounted to $50 million; some repair efforts may have been undermined by the looting of copper wire in Hugo's aftermath. At least six workers were killed while repairing power lines. Equipment from the continental U.S. for the restoration of Puerto Rican water supplies arrived beginning on September 22, with the capacity to produce over 200,000 U.S. gallons (760,000 liters) of potable water daily. USAF sent power generators, plastic sheeting for repairs, and 200,000 The U.S. Army Corps of Engineers distributed over 2 million gallons (7.6 million liters) of water using 33 tank trucks, with the costs subsidized by the U.S. government. U.S. Coast Guard C-130s and two cutters were sent to San Juan to render aid and deliver supplies. From its supply centers in the continental U.S., the American Red Cross amassed supplies for victims in Puerto Rico and mounted its largest domestic relief effort in four years.

=== Continental United States ===
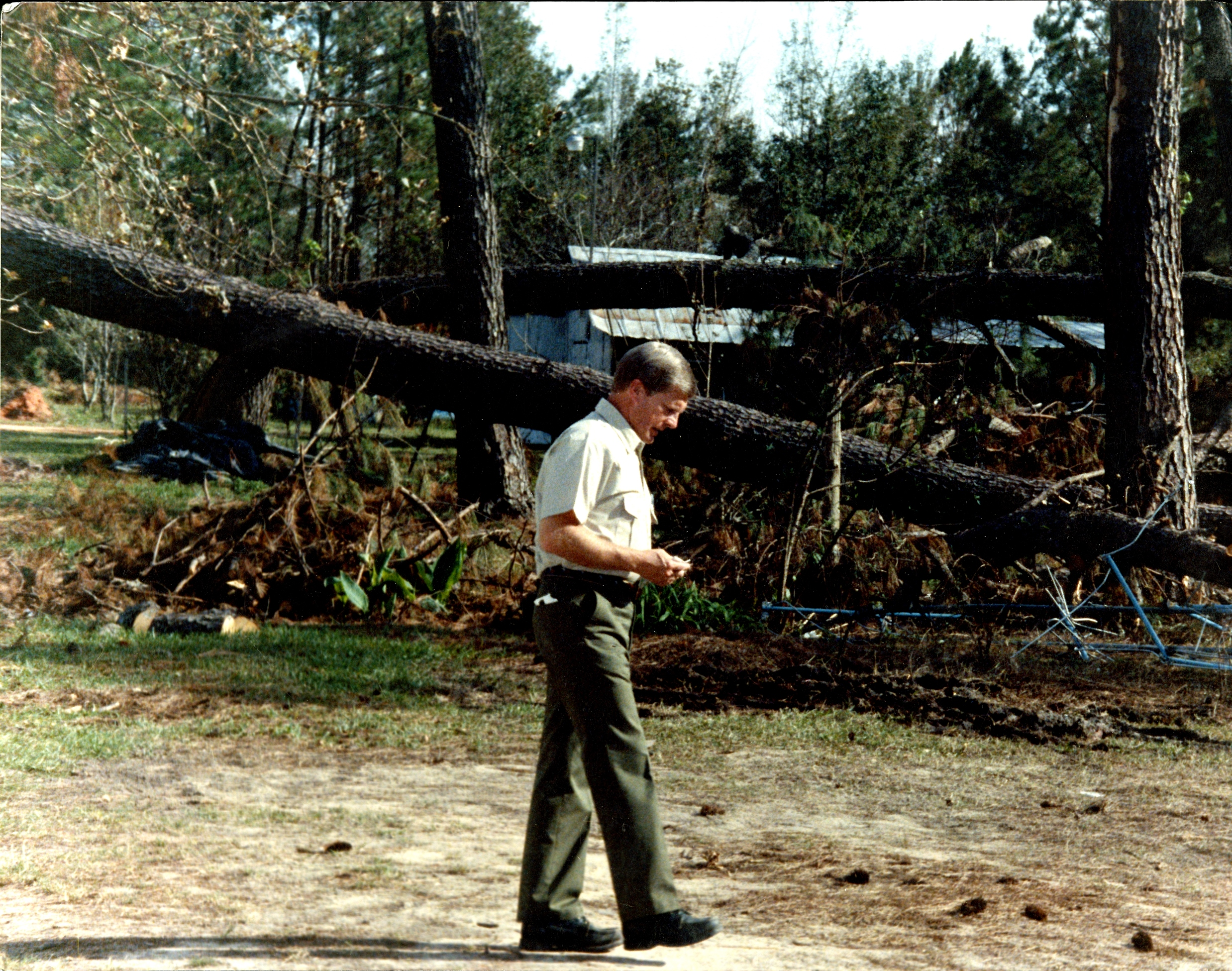
Governor Carroll Campbell touring Hugo's damage in South Carolina

An overnight curfew was enacted by Charleston Mayor Joseph P. Riley Jr. on September 22 while martial law was declared for Sullivan's Island. A federal disaster area was declared for 24 counties in South Carolina. Federal resources for the aftermath in South Carolina were strained by earlier relief efforts for Hugo's impact in the Caribbean; they would be strained further by the 1989 Loma Prieta earthquake in October. The presence of debris on roads hampered relief efforts and increased recovery costs. In contrast with prior trends, more people were killed after the hurricane's passage rather than due to the hurricane's direct forces. Several members of repair crews were killed or injured in South Carolina and Puerto Rico from ungrounded portable generators. There were 24 deaths in the aftermath of Hugo in South Carolina. Five people died of heart attacks while surveying Hugo's aftermath in Dorchester County. SCE&G fully restored power to its customers in 18 days after deploying 4,703 personnel. The company also offered free bus service for a week and distributed dry ice to the public.

Between 15 and 20 thousand people were left homeless in Charleston County. Homes were primarily rebuilt and repaired by non-profit and ad-hoc groups. Churches and other private non-profit groups managed replacement housing for Hugo victims in at least four South Carolina counties whose governments lacked such capabilities. Temporary housing assistance was extended to 30,000 storm victims in the state by the FEMA at a cost of $31 million. In addition to those offered housing grants, 243 families were moved to FEMA mobile homes beginning a week after Hugo until April 1990. State and local governments together contributed $8.25 million to public assistance projects. After the storm, Governor Campbell said that the storm destroyed enough timber in South Carolina to "frame a home for every family in the state of West Virginia." An immense salvage effort was undertaken to harvest downed pine trees for pulpwood before they deteriorated to the point where they could not be used. Still standing timber that appeared usable for lumber and plywood frequently had annular separations of the rings that made them dangerous to saw and nearly impossible to cut into plies, so they were also downgraded into pulpwood, leading to such a drop in pulpwood prices that eventually much of the salvage effort ceased. United States Senator from South Carolina Fritz Hollings referred to FEMA as "a bunch of bureaucratic jackasses" during a speech on the floor of the United States Senate. An investigation was launched, which led to some reforms in FEMA procedures that helped the agency do a somewhat better job during Hurricane Andrew, the next catastrophic hurricane to strike the United States. The economy of South Carolina continued to grow after Hugo, though some sectors did not benefit from recovery efforts. There was a 14 percent increase in traffic accidents in Charleston in the wake of the hurricane. Delays in traffic in the city led to an estimated 35 percent increase in vehicular operating costs in the months following the hurricane.

=== Ecological aftermath ===
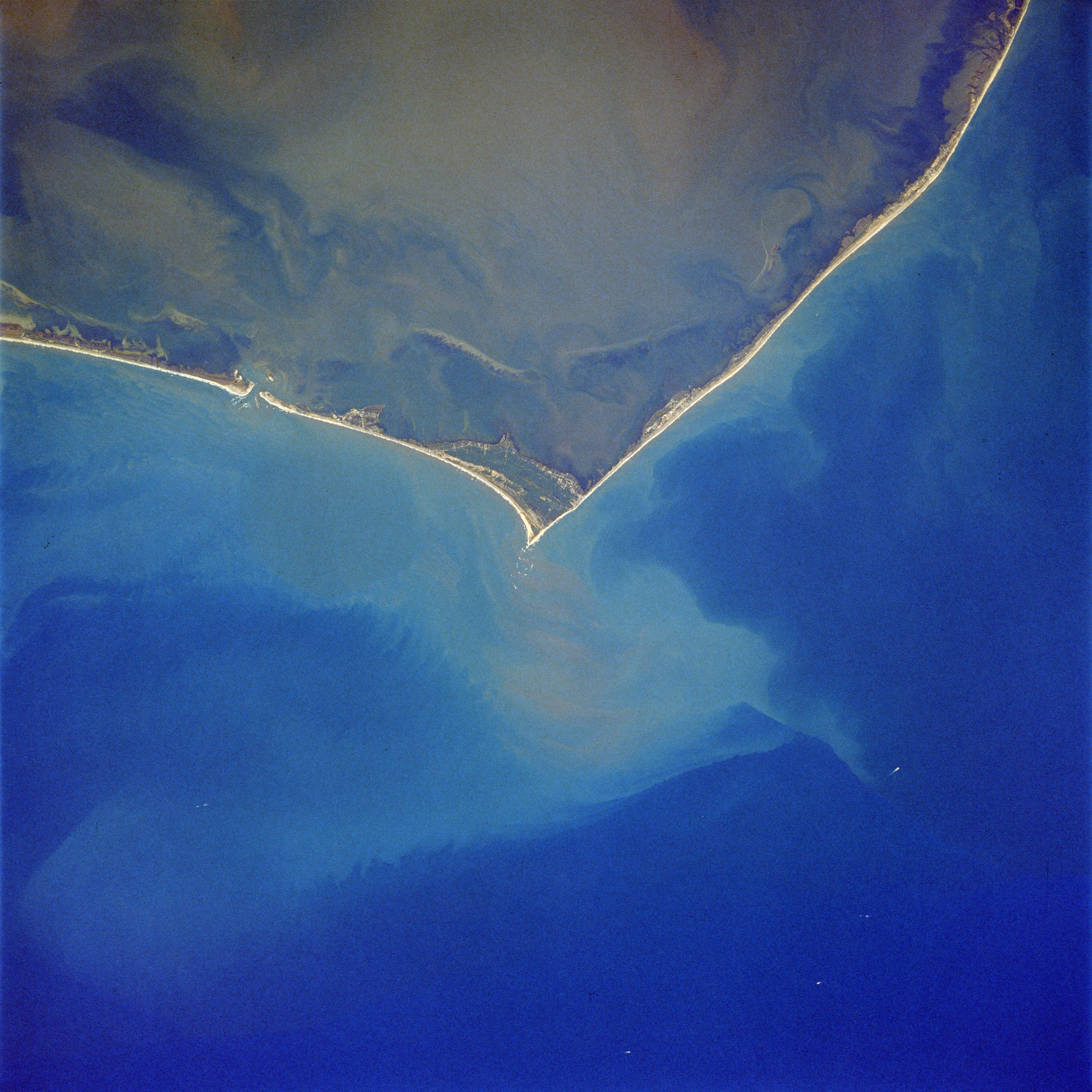
Sediment displaced along Cape Hatteras due to rainfall from Hugo

The defoliation of mangroves and the introduction of freshwater runoff into brackish waters created anoxic conditions that killed many fish in Guadeloupe's mangrove habitats; fish populations would recover by January 1990. The low species richness of mangrove forests was found to a contributing factor to Hugo's damage upon vegetation. Forests with a greater vertical extent and higher species richness were more protected from the hurricane's effects. Bat populations in Montserrat dropped 20-fold in response to extensive habitat loss and community composition transitioned from one dominated by small frugivores to one dominated by larger frugivores and omnivores. Extensive defoliation was documented in the forests of Dominica, Guadeloupe, Montserrat, and Puerto Rico, where vegetation was stripped bare of their flowers, fruits, and leaves.

A survey of bird populations in Saint Croix observed that Hugo's aftermath may have stressed birds more than the hurricane's immediate meteorological forces. Frugivorous, nectarivorous, and seminivorous bird populations declined most among avian diet groups as a result of vegetation loss. The bridled quail-dove (Geotrygon mystacea) was driven out of its traditional habitats on Saint Croix. Declines in the populations of certain bird species were also noted in Saint John. The destruction of habitats forced the relocation of some avian species such as the pearly-eyed thrasher (Margarops fuscatus) and northern waterthrush (Seiurus noveboracensis). The populations or habitats of three endangered Puerto Rican birds were affected by Hugo: the Puerto Rican amazon (Amazona vittata), the Yellow-shouldered blackbird (Agelaius xanthomus), and the Puerto Rican plain pigeon (Columba inornata wetmorei). El Yunque National Forest lost 15 percent of its trees, valued at $5.2 million. However, the increased exposure to sunlight following the loss of tree canopies led to increased diversity of plant species. In Montserrat, the endemic Montserrat oriole (Icterus oberi) was driven out of the South Soufriere Hills after losing much of its habitat.

Sewage contamination and poor water quality briefly impacted shellfish populations along the coast of South Carolina. The turbulent action generated by Hugo in streams lowered concentrations of dissolved oxygen and increased concentrations of toxic phenols. Nekton communities suffered increased mortality in river channels and marsh creeks near the Charleston harbor due to hypoxia and lowered salinity in the water, though their populations recovered within two months. Increased salinization of coastal soil led to increased tree mortality and discoloration or defoliation of trees. These surge-battered forests were devoid of insects and terrestrial vertebrates for six months, though their populations were well-below pre-storm levels. Benthic invertebrates experienced a 97% decrease in population density but recovered to pre-storm levels in three months. At least 25 coastal species of birds were displaced as far as 200 mi (320 km) inland by the storm. Across the Carolinas, Hugo's winds increased the quantity of downed brush, timber, and debris by up to 15 times their normal amounts, significantly increasing the risk of wildfires throughout the region. FEMA designated $7 million towards forest fire mitigation in Hugo's aftermath.

=== Retirement ===
On account of the destruction and casualties the hurricane caused in the Caribbean and the Carolinas, the name Hugo was retired in the spring of 1990 by the World Meteorological Organization from the rotating lists of Atlantic hurricane names and will never be used again for another Atlantic tropical cyclone. It was replaced with the name Humberto for the 1995 season.

== In popular culture ==
- Hugo, la chanson du cyclone [Hugo, the song of the cyclone], Thomas Fersen, 1995
- Sois belle [Be beautiful], Expérience 7, 1989 (national tribute to Guadeloupe after the passage of Hurricane Hugo)
- Hurricane Hugo is referenced in the backstory of a character in the HBO miniseries Station Eleven.

== See also ==
- List of North Carolina hurricanes (1980–1999)
- List of South Carolina hurricanes
- Hurricane Hazel (1954) – quickly moved ashore the Carolinas, causing widespread damage into eastern Canada
- Hurricane Gracie (1959) – made landfall on the south end of Edisto Island in South Carolina as a Category 4 hurricane
- Hurricane Georges (1998) – impacted much of the Lesser and Greater Antilles at a similar strength
- Hurricane Maria (2017) – caused devastation across parts of the Lesser Antilles and Puerto Rico, leading to a significant humanitarian crisis
- Hurricane Lee (2023) – also achieved Category 5 status at a very easterly position
- Hurricane Helene (2024) - a devastating and deadly Category 4 hurricane that caused widespread catastrophic damage and numerous fatalities across the Southeastern United States

== Notes ==
Preceded by Alicia	Costliest Atlantic hurricanes on record 1989	Succeeded by Andrew
