= Abundant Seafood =

Abundant Seafood is a commercial fishing operation run by Mark Marhefka, who lives in Mount Pleasant, South Carolina, and works from Shem Creek in the Charleston Harbor, South Carolina. He supplies many of Charleston's fine dining establishments who focus on local food and local farming, and is known for bringing relatively unpopular fish (what he called "trash fish" to Anthony Bourdain) to attention. His customers have to be flexible; he says, "distribution is based on customer loyalty". Marhefka started Abundant Seafood in 2007 with the desire to make locally caught seafood available to Charleston, and in 2010 added a consumer-sponsored fishery, where local people can reserve up to ten pounds of seafood per month.
