= List of places in Montserrat =

This is a list of places – inhabited or otherwise – in Montserrat. Names of communities within the area affected by the volcanic eruption can be found on published maps, for example in journal articles.

== Key ==
(destroyed) – destroyed in the 1995 eruption of the Soufrière Hills volcano

(inhabited) – still inhabited

(overgrown) – buildings remain but are overgrown

(uninhabited) – uninhabited as a result of the 1995 eruption, but not destroyed

== B ==
- Bethel (destroyed)
- Brades (inhabited)
- Bramble Village (destroyed)
- Bramble Airport (destroyed)

== C ==
- Cork Hill (uninhabited)
- Cudjoehead (inhabited)

== D ==
- Davy Hill (inhabited)

== E ==
- Elberton (uninhabited)

== F ==
- Frith (inhabited)
- Fogarthy's Hill

== G ==
- Gages (uninhabited)
- Garibaldi Hill (uninhabited)
- Gerald's (inhabited)

== H ==
- Harris (overgrown)

== K ==
- Kinsale (destroyed)

== L ==
- Lee's Yard (uninhabited)
- Little Bay (inhabited)
- Long Ground (destroyed)
- Lookout (inhabited)

== M ==
- Manjack Heights (inhabited)

== O ==
- Old Town (inhabited)
- Olveston (inhabited)

== P ==
- Plymouth (destroyed)

== R ==
- Richmond Hill (overgrown)

== S ==
- Salem (inhabited)
- St George's Hill (inhabited)
- St John's (inhabited)
- St Patrick's (destroyed)
- St Peter's (inhabited)

== T ==
- Trants (destroyed)
- Tuitts (destroyed)

== W ==
- Weekes (uninhabited)
- Windy Hill (uninhabited)
- Woodlands (inhabited)

== See also ==
- Little Bay
- Montserrat
- Plymouth
