= Dorian Harper =

Montserratian footballer

Personal information
- Full name: Dorian Harper
- Date of birth: 31 August 1982 (age 44)
- Place of birth: Plymouth, Montserrat
- Positions: Defender; midfielder

Team information
- Current team: P.C. United FC

Senior career*
Years	Team	Apps	(Gls)
2010–	P.C. United FC		

International career
2000–2008	Montserrat	3	(0 (UTC))
- * Club domestic league appearances and goals

Dorian Harper is a defender and midfielder who plays for P.C. United FC in the Montserrat Championship

== Career ==
He played for Montserrat national team three times once coming on as a sub his most recent appearance came in 2010 for the WCQ.He is also the second youngest ever montserratian make his national team debut at 21 and 202 days.
