= Alex Daley =

Montserratian footballer

Personal information
- Date of birth: 18 August 1986 (age 40)
- Place of birth: Plymouth, Montserrat
- Height: 1.78 m (5 ft 10 in)
- Position: Defender

Team information
- Current team: P.C. United FC

Youth career
- Bata Falcons
- P.C. United FC

Senior career*
Years	Team	Apps	(Gls)
2010–	P.C. United FC		

International career
2008	Montserrat	1	(0)
- * Club domestic league appearances and goals

Alex Daley is a defender who plays for P.C. United FC and the Montserrat National team, He debuted for Montserrat against Suriname in a 7-1 defeat in a WCQ.
