= Seoul Central College of Medicine =

- Established: 2003
- Location: Brades, Montserrat; 33.894°N 84.253°W
- Website: www.seoulmed.org

Seoul Central College of Medicine (Also known as ACU Seoul Central College of Medicine) is an offshore private medical school located near Brades, Montserrat. The university opened in 2003 with headquarters in Atlanta, Georgia and its campus located in Montserrat. The opening session started on 1 September 2003, with classes held on the McChestney Estate property in Olveston, until relocating to the Mongo Hill Campus.

== Programs ==
Programs are open to both Montserratians and foreign students and curriculum includes premed, other graduate courses, as well as Doctor of Medicine degrees.

=== Premed program ===
Undergraduate courses for a Bachelor of Science in Life Sciences are available. The course requires 90 credit hours of study and offers them in a 16-month continuous format with no break. The school will allow a maximum of 45 credit hours to be transferred from other institutions, at the discretion of the admissions department.

=== Medical program ===
The school curriculum is based upon the US model, requiring 38 months of study to complete a Doctor of Medicine degree, followed by a 2-4 year residency program.

== Accreditation ==
Atlanta Central University, the foreign affiliate, of Seoul Central College of Medicine was approved as a registered company of Montserrat in 2003, but stricken from the rolls in February 2013. Seoul Central College of Medicine is listed in the FAIMER International Medical Education Directory (IMED) effective in 2003.
