= National Museum of Montserrat =

National museum in Montserrat

The National Museum of Montserrat
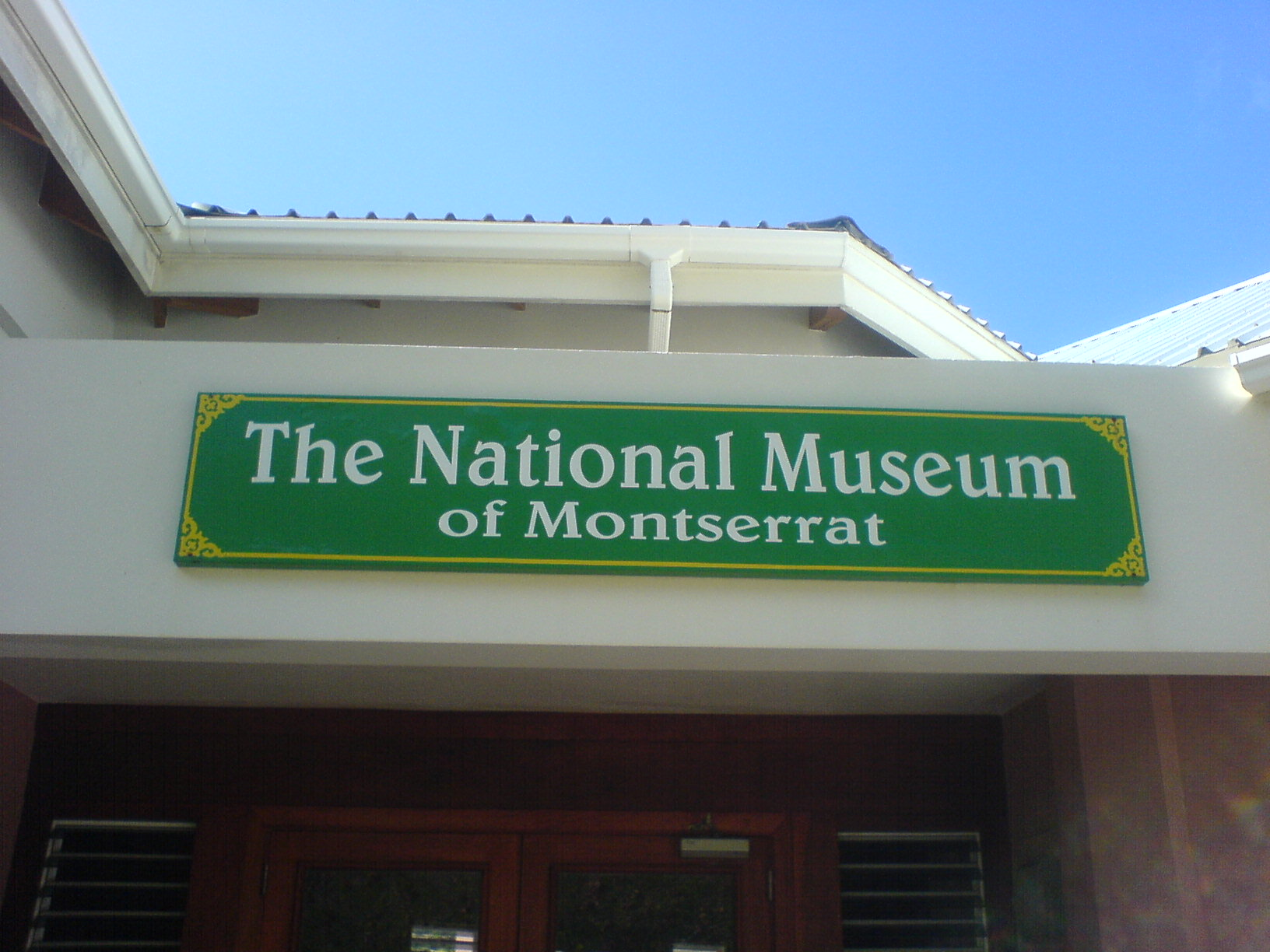
- Sign
- Established: 2012
- Location: Little Bay, Montserrat
- Coordinates: 16°48′1″N 62°12′7″W
- Type: Local History

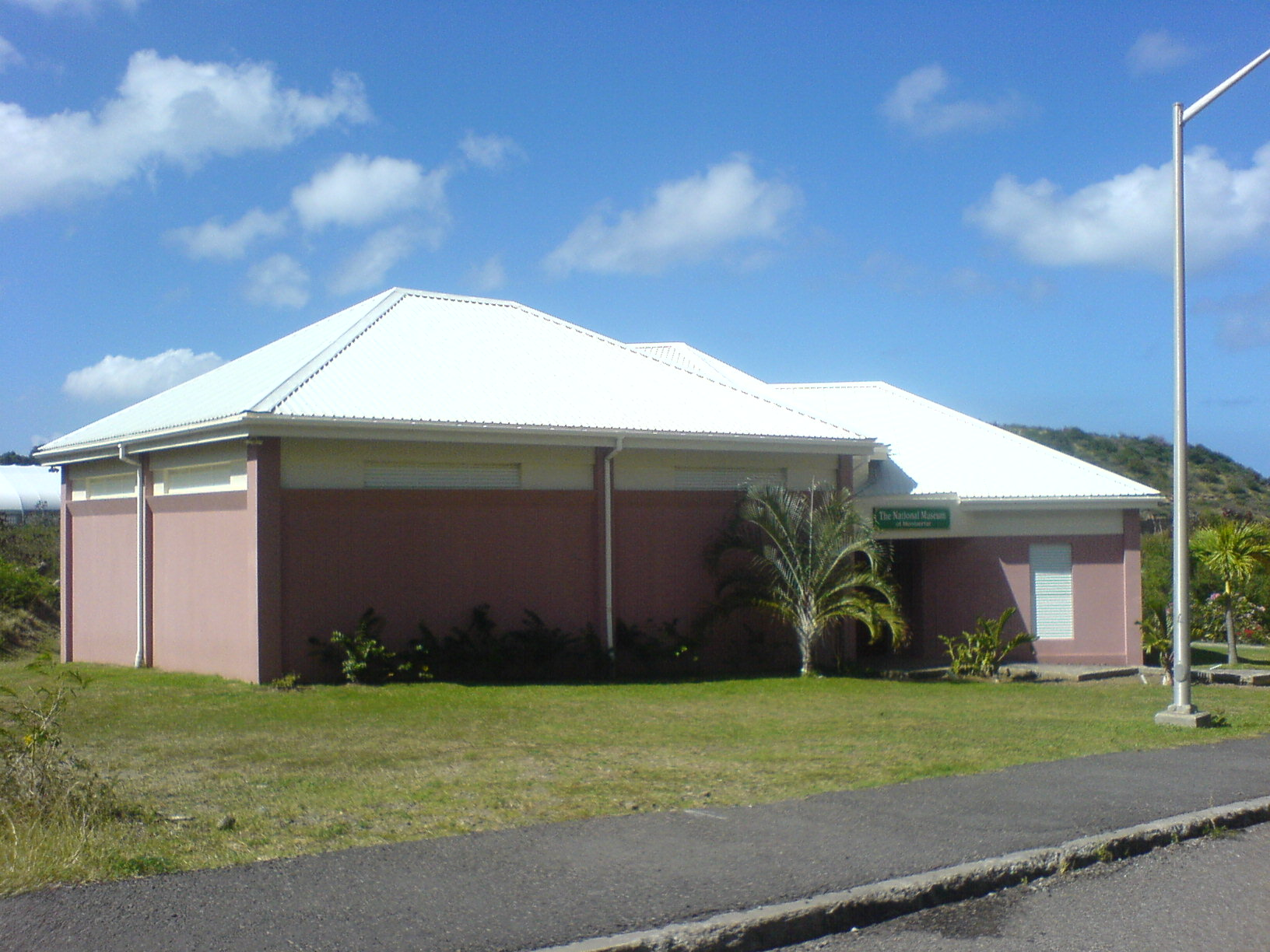
building

The National Museum of Montserrat is a national museum focusing on the history of Montserrat, Lesser Antilles. The Museum is operated by the non-profit Montserrat National Trust.

It is located on the Main Road in Little Bay and is open to visitors on Thursdays & Fridays from 9 a.m. to 2 p.m. and on Saturdays from 10 a.m. to 3 p.m.

It was opened in 2012.

Museum information is available on the National Museum of Montserrat page.

== See also ==
- List of national museums
