= St. Peter's, Montserrat =

St. Peter's
- Town
- Location of Peter's within Montserrat St. Peter's (the Caribbean)
- Coordinates: 16°46′N 62°12′W
- Country: United Kingdom
- Overseas territory: Montserrat
- Time zone: UTC-4 (Atlantic)

St. Peter's is a village in Montserrat, a British Overseas Territory in the West Indies, situated to the north of the island, in Saint Peter Parish.

St Peters Anglican Church is a place of worship in the village.
