= Mongo Hill =

Village in Montserrat

- Location in Montserrat Mongo Hill (the Caribbean)
- Coordinates: 16°46′39.68″N 62°11′35.81″W
- Country: United Kingdom
- Overseas territory: Montserrat

Population (2018)
  - Total: 405

Mongo Hill is a village in the northern region of Montserrat. It had a population of 405 in the 2018 intercensal count, including the locality of St. John's.

== Demographics ==
Mongo Hill had a population of 405 in 2018. Major ethnic groups in the village included Africans (87.7%), Hispanics (4.7%), mixed (5.2%), and others (2.5%). 46.2% of the population had been born in Montserrat, with other places of birth including Guyana (22.7%), Jamaica (7.7%), and the rest of the world (23.5%). Major religions included Seventh-day Adventists (19.3%) and Pentecostalists (19.0%).
