= Saint Peter Parish, Montserrat =

Parish of Montserrat

Coordinates: 16°46′00″N 62°12′00″W

The parishes of Montserrat: Saint Peter is shown in pale red

Saint Peter is one of Montserrat's three administrative parishes. As of 2009, it is the only parish to be inhabited. This would give the parish a population of between 4,000 and 6,000. Saint Peter Parish covers the north-west of the island, and was therefore least affected by the eruptions of Soufrière Hills, the island's volcano.

The John A. Osborne Airport is located in the parish.

== Populated places ==
- Brades
- Davy Hill
- Lookout
- Salem
- St. John's
- St. Peter's
