= Olveston (disambiguation) =

Olveston is a small village and parish in Gloucestershire, England, UK.

Olveston may also refer to:

- Olveston (house), a stately home in New Zealand
- Olveston, Montserrat, a suburb of Salem on the island of Montserrat
- Olveston House, a large home once inhabited by Beatles producer George Martin, now a guest house, in Salem, Montserrat
