= Soldier Ghaut petroglyphs =

Group of rock wall carvings in Montserrat

The Soldier Ghaut petroglyphs are a group of carvings on rock walls in a seasonal streambed in Montserrat discovered by hikers in 2016 and 2018. The carvings are believed to be between 1000 and 1500 years old and are the first known petroglyphs on the island or its nearest neighbor, Antigua.

== Discovery ==
In 2016, nine petroglyphs were discovered on the Lesser Antilles island of Montserrat by local residents, including local politician Shirley Osborne, hiking in a wooded area near Soldier Ghaut (a seasonal streambed) in the northwest area of the island. Another petroglyph was discovered in 2018 on the other side of the streambed. The carvings are believed to be between 1000 and 1500 years old and are the first known petroglyphs on the island or its nearest neighbor, Antigua.

== Characteristics ==
The main body of petroglyphs, on the right-hand side of the streambed, consists of 9 elements covering area measuring 220 centimetres (87 in) (horizontally) by 324 centimetres (128 in) (vertically). They are divided into two groupings and separated by a horizontal bar.

The carving on the left-hand side of the streambed depicts a face measuring 50 centimetres (20 in) square.

The size of the petroglyphs is "some-what larger than the norm in Caribbean rock art".

== Research ==
A research team consisting of archeologists from the US, Guadeloupe, and Montserrat were invited by the Montserrat National Trust to study and measure the petroglyphs and create a plan for preservation and public access.
