= Barzeys =

Village in Montserrat

- Location in Montserrat Barzeys (the Caribbean)
- Coordinates: 16°46′43″N 62°12′00″W
- Country: United Kingdom
- Overseas territory: Montserrat

Population (2018)
  - Total: 208

Barzeys is a village in the northern region of Montserrat. It had a population of 208 in the 2018 intercensal count.

== Demographics ==
Barzeys had a population of 208 in 2018. Major ethnic groups in the village include Africans (88.9%), Hispanics (2.9%), mixed (1.9%), and others (6.2%). 69.7% of the population was born in Montserrat, with other locations including Guyana (6.2%), Jamaica (4.8%), unknown (0.5%), and the rest of the world (18.8%). Major religions included Anglicans (20.2%) and Pentecostalists (14.9%).
