= Davy Hill =

- Location in Montserrat Davy Hill (the Caribbean)
- Coordinates: 16.794513°N 62.204981°W
- Country: United Kingdom
- Overseas territory: Montserrat

Population (2011)
  - Total: 457

Davy Hill is a town in the north of the Caribbean island of Montserrat, located close to the west coast near the narrowest point of the island on a saddle between the main bulk of the island's Centre Hills, and the peak of Silver Hill close to the island's northern tip.

Davy Hill is close to the town and housing estate called Brades that is the location of the de facto temporary capital of Montserrat.

Davy Hill is connected by road with the settlement of St John's, which lies two kilometres to the southeast.

== Demographics ==
The village of Davy Hill (Village 11401) comprises four enumeration areas, Davy Hill North, Davy Hill South, Sweeneys North, and Sweeneys South. The village is located in the Northern Region and has 457 people.

African/Black	Caucasian/White or Hispanic/Spanish	Mixed	All other categories
410	20	17	10
410	20	17	10

Davy Hill has 256 foreigners, mostly coming from Guyana, Antigua and Barbuda, and the United States.

Antigua and Barbuda	Guyana	Jamaica	United States of America	All other categories	Not Stated
27	47	12	27	141	2
