= P.C. United FC =

Association football club in Montserrat

PC United
- Full name: PC United
- Nickname: PC
- Founded: 22 May 2012; 13 years ago
- Ground: Blakes Estate Stadium
- Capacity: 1,000
- Chairman: Kai Velmer
- League: Montserrat Championship

PC United is a Montserratian professional football club based in Brades. P.C. United compete in the Montserrat Championship, the highest tier of football on the island.
