= Olveston, Montserrat =

Olveston
- Village
- Map showing location of Olveston
- Coordinates: 16°45′14.72″N 62°13′38.69″W
- Sovereign state: United Kingdom
- Overseas territory: Montserrat
- Parish: Saint Peter Parish

Area
  - Urban: 0.31 sq mi (0.79 km^{2})
- Elevation: 184 ft (56 m)

Population (2011)
  - Village: 292

Olveston is a village on the Caribbean island of Montserrat.

The settlement was created as a plantation, one of two on Montserrat which were bought by Joseph Sturge (1793–1859) to demonstrate that slavery was unnecessary.
