= UTC−04:00 =

Time zone

- Time zone
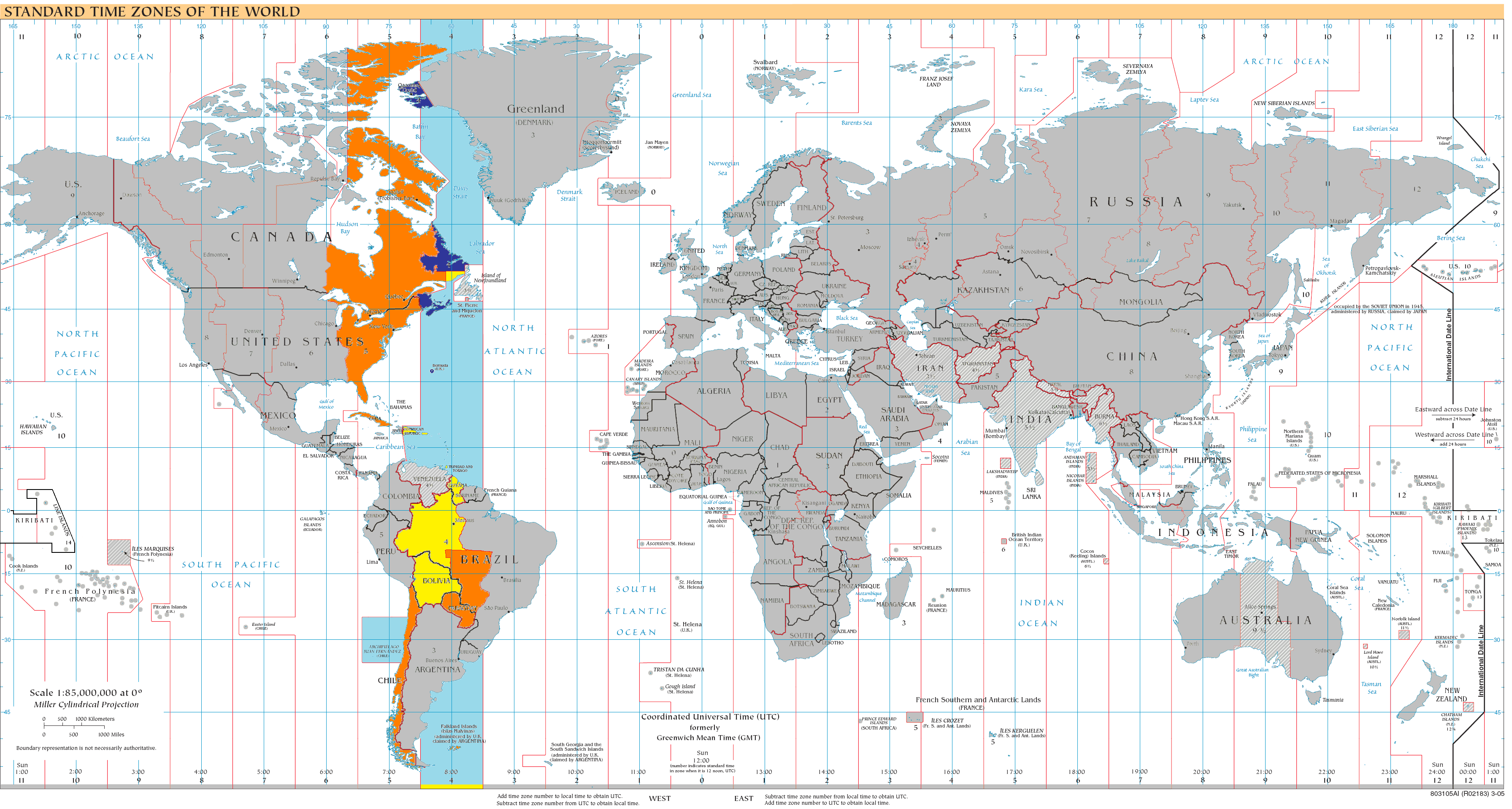
- 2008 world map with the time zone highlighted: Blue (January), orange (July), yellow (year-round) and light blue (sea areas)

UTC offset
- UTC: UTC−04:00

Current time
- 08:46, 23 July 2026 UTC−04:00 [refresh]

Central meridian
- 60 degrees W

Date-time group
- Q

Time in Brazil, since 25 April 2019. Time in Brazil: ACT / Acre Time / UTC−5 / (BRT–2); AMT / Amazon Time / UTC−4 / (BRT−1); BRT / Brasília Time / UTC−3 / (BRT); FNT / Fernando de Noronha Time / UTC−2 / (BRT+1)

UTC−04:00 is an identifier for a time offset from UTC of −04:00.

It is observed in the Eastern Time Zone (e.g., in Canada and the United States) during daylight saving time, as Eastern Daylight Time. The Atlantic Time Zone observes it during standard time.

It is observed all year in the Eastern Caribbean and several South American countries.

== As standard time (Northern Hemisphere winter) ==
Principal cities: Halifax, Saint John, Fredericton, Hamilton

=== North America ===
- Canada – Atlantic Time Zone
  - New Brunswick
  - Newfoundland and Labrador
    - Labrador
      - Except the area between L'Anse-au-Clair and Norman Bay
  - Nova Scotia
  - Prince Edward Island
- Denmark
  - Greenland
    - Pituffik (Thule) (former settlement), Qaanaaq (present settlement)
- United Kingdom
  - Bermuda

== As daylight saving time (Northern Hemisphere summer) ==
Principal cities: New York, Washington, Philadelphia, Boston, Atlanta, Miami, Detroit, Baltimore, Cleveland, Pittsburgh, Indianapolis, Orlando, Charlotte, Charleston, Wilmington, Key West, Toronto, Montreal, Ottawa, Quebec City, Iqaluit, Nassau, Havana, Kingston, Port-au-Prince, Cockburn Town, Providenciales

=== North America ===
- Canada (Eastern Time Zone)
  - Nunavut
    - Qikiqtaaluk Region except Resolute
  - Ontario
    - East of 90° West longitude
  - Quebec
    - Most of province except easternmost part of Côte-Nord
- United States (Eastern Time Zone)
  - Delaware
  - District of Columbia
  - Florida
    - Entire state except the counties of Bay, Calhoun, Escambia, Holmes, Jackson, Okaloosa, Santa Rosa, Walton, and Washington, and northern Gulf county (panhandle)
  - Georgia
  - Indiana
    - Except the northwestern counties of Jasper, Lake, LaPorte, Newton, Porter and Starke, and the southwestern counties of Gibson, Perry, Posey, Spencer, Vanderburgh and Warrick
  - Kentucky
    - Counties to the east of the counties of Breckinridge, Grayson, Hart, Green, Adair, Russell and Clinton
  - Maryland
  - Michigan
    - Except the western counties of Dickinson, Gogebic, Iron and Menominee
  - New England (states of Connecticut, Massachusetts, Maine, New Hampshire, Rhode Island and Vermont)
  - New Jersey
  - New York
  - North Carolina
  - Ohio
  - Pennsylvania
  - South Carolina
  - Tennessee
    - The counties of Scott, Morgan, Roane, Rhea, Meigs and Bradley, and all counties to the east of these
  - Virginia
  - West Virginia

=== Caribbean ===
- Bahamas
- Cuba
- Dominican Republic
- Haiti
- United Kingdom
  - Turks and Caicos Islands

== As standard time (year-round) ==
Principal cities: Caracas, Manaus, La Paz, Georgetown, Santa Cruz de la Sierra, St. John's, Bridgetown, Roseau, Santo Domingo, Gustavia, St. George's, The Bottom, Oranjestad, Philipsburg, Lower Prince's Quarter, Basseterre, Castries, Kingstown, Port of Spain, San Fernando, The Valley, Road Town, Plymouth, Brades, Little Bay, San Juan, Charlotte Amalie, Oranjestad, Kralendijk, Willemstad, Pointe-à-Pitre, Les Abymes, Fort-de-France, Maracaibo, Blanc-Sablon, Harrington Harbour

=== South America ===
- Bolivia
- Brazil
  - The states of Amazonas (except westernmost municipalities), Mato Grosso, Mato Grosso do Sul, Rondônia and Roraima
- Guyana
- Venezuela (since 2016)

=== Eastern Caribbean ===
- Antigua and Barbuda
- Barbados
- Dominica
- Dominican Republic
- France
  - Guadeloupe
    - Basse-Terre
    - Grande-Terre
    - Les Saintes
    - Marie-Galante
    - La Désirade
  - Martinique
  - Saint Barthélemy
  - Saint Martin
- Grenada
  - Carriacou and Petite Martinique
- Netherlands
  - Saba
  - Sint Eustatius
  - Sint Maarten
- Saint Kitts and Nevis
  - Saint Kitts
  - Nevis
- Saint Lucia
- Saint Vincent and the Grenadines
  - Saint Vincent
  - The Grenadines
- Trinidad and Tobago
  - Tobago
  - Trinidad
- United Kingdom
  - Anguilla
  - British Virgin Islands
    - Tortola
    - Virgin Gorda
    - Anegada
    - Jost Van Dyke
  - Montserrat

=== US territories ===
- United States
  - Puerto Rico
    - Spanish Virgin Islands
  - United States Virgin Islands
    - Saint Croix
    - Saint Thomas
    - Saint John
    - Water Island

=== Other Caribbean locales ===
- Netherlands
  - Aruba
  - Bonaire
  - Curaçao

=== North America ===
- Canada – Atlantic Time Zone
  - Quebec
    - East of the 63°W longitude (Le Golfe-du-Saint-Laurent Regional County Municipality)

=== Antarctica ===
==== Southern Ocean ====
- Some bases in Antarctica. See also Time in Antarctica
  - Brazil
    - Comandante Ferraz Antarctic Station
  - Russia
    - Bellingshausen Station

== As standard time (Southern Hemisphere winter) ==
Principal cities: Santiago

=== South America ===
- Chile (except Easter Island and Magallanes/Antarctic)

=== Antarctica ===
- Some bases in Antarctica. See also Time in Antarctica

== See also ==
- UTC−05:00
- UTC−03:00
- Time in Argentina
- Time in Brazil
- Time in Canada
- Time in Chile
- Time in Denmark
- Time in Paraguay
- Time in the United States
- Time in Trinidad and Tobago
- Time in Uruguay
- Time in Venezuela
