= St. John's, Montserrat =

St. John's
- Town
- Location of St. John's within Montserrat St. John's (the Caribbean)
- Coordinates: 16°47′N 62°11′W
- Country: United Kingdom
- Overseas territory: Montserrat
- Time zone: UTC-4 (Atlantic)

St. John's is a village in Montserrat, a British Overseas Territory in the West Indies, situated to the north of the island, in Saint Peter Parish.

The John A. Osborne Airport is situated north of the village.
