= Plymouth, Montserrat =

Ghost town former capital of Montserrat

Plymouth
- Ghost town
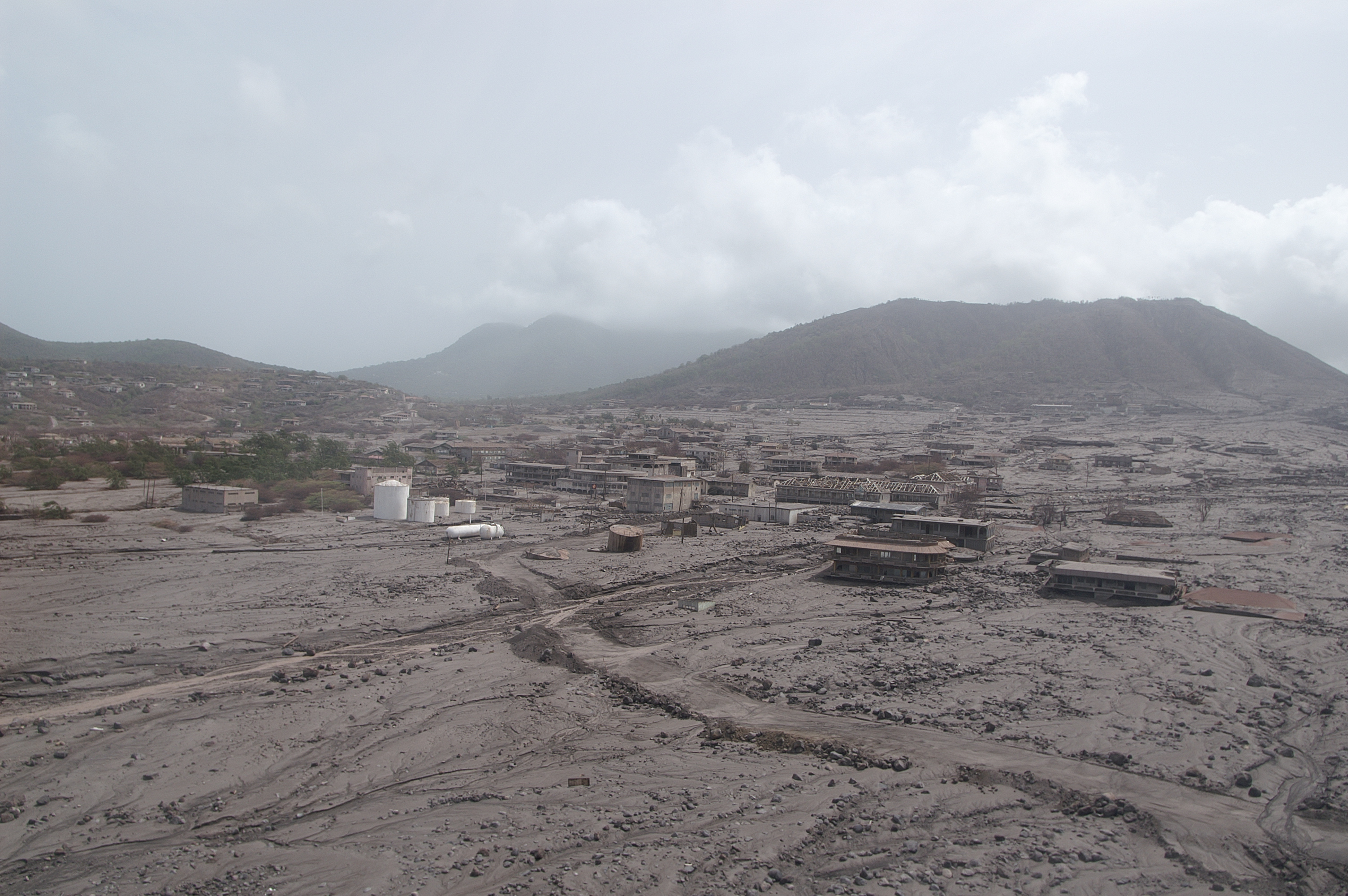
- Plymouth in 2006, following the 1997 eruptions that buried most of the town in ash
- Nickname: The Emerald Isle of the Caribbean
- Motto(s): "A people of excellence, moulded by nature, nurtured by God."
- Location within Montserrat Location within North America
- Coordinates: 16.706417°N 62.215839°W
- Country: United Kingdom
- Overseas territory: Montserrat

Population (2016)
  - Total: 0
- 4,000 inhabitants before evacuation as a result of volcanic eruption
- Time zone: UTC−4 (Atlantic)

Plymouth is a ghost town and the former capital of the island of Montserrat, an overseas territory of the United Kingdom located in the Leeward Island chain of the Lesser Antilles, West Indies.

Constructed during the Georgian era on historical lava deposits near the then long-inactive Soufrière Hills volcano, the town was evacuated in 1995 when the volcano resumed erupting. Plymouth was eventually abandoned permanently in 1997, after it was substantially buried by a series of pyroclastic flows and lahars.

For centuries, it had been the only port of entry to the island. Brades was designated the capital in November 2025, while a new capital is under construction nearby at Little Bay.

== History ==
=== St. Anthony's Church ===
After the establishment of the first European colony on the island of Montserrat in 1632, St. Anthony's Church was established in Plymouth in 1636. Although there is a St. Anthony in Catholicism, it is believed that Governor Anthony Brisket, who went to England to secure funds to build the church, had the church named after himself. The church had to be rebuilt several times throughout its history due to damage from earthquakes and hurricanes. As of September 2021, the church is buried deep in the ash.

=== Hurricane Hugo ===
Montserrat was struck by Hurricane Hugo on 17 September 1989. The hurricane destroyed a 55-metre (180 ft) stone jetty in Plymouth's harbour. Many other buildings, including schools, health centres, and the recently constructed central hospital building, were rendered unusable by damage from the storm. Given that the hospital was the only one on the island, and damages were extensive enough that all patients had to be relocated, a survey conducted by engineers from the National Emergency Management Agency of Trinidad and Tobago concluded that the hospital should undergo substantial redesign in order to ensure that its structural strength could withstand future storms.

=== Volcanic eruptions and abandonment ===
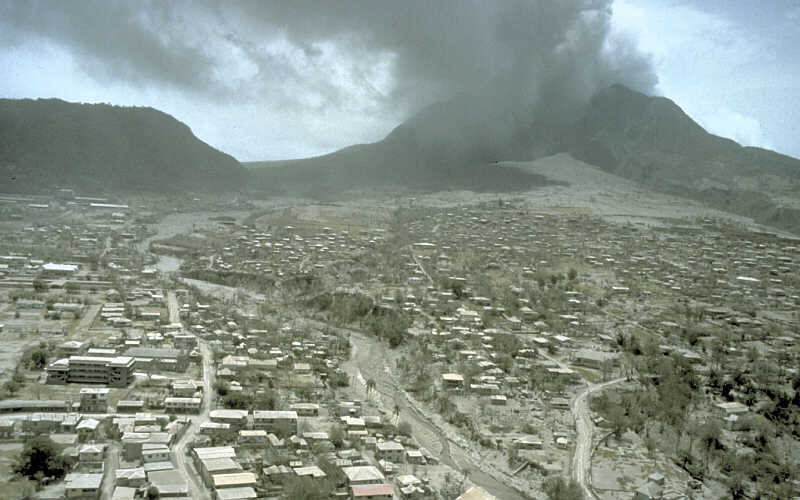
By 12 July 1997, pyroclastic flows had burned much of what had not already been covered in ash

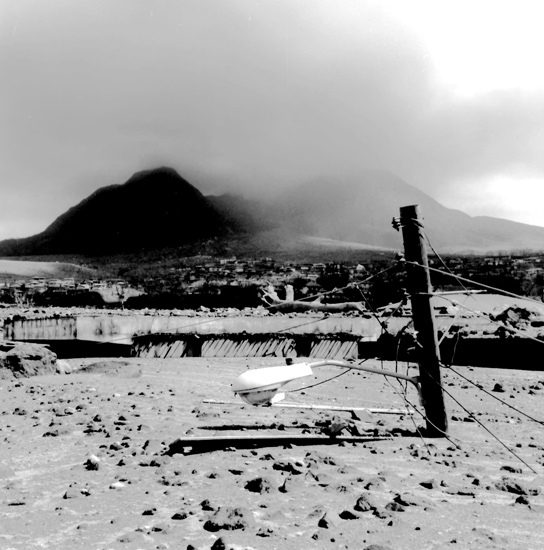
Ash piled as high as a streetlamp on the streets of Plymouth (1999)

Beginning on 18 July 1995, a series of huge eruptions at the Soufrière Hills volcano, which had been inactive for centuries, sent ash falls across a wide area of southern Montserrat including the capital, Plymouth. It was soon clear that the town was in grave danger. On 21 August 1995, tephra fell on Plymouth, necessitating an evacuation that lasted until 3 September 1995. Following renewed volcanic activity, on 1 December 1995 residents were evacuated for the second time. This evacuation lasted for one month before residents were allowed back on 1 January 1996.

On 27 March 1996, a series of hot ash emissions and pyroclastic flows began, marking the most dangerous period for the volcano up to that point. Areas nearest the volcano were immediately evacuated; as the volcanic activity continued to escalate, on 3 April 1996, Plymouth was evacuated for the third and final time. The island was divided into risk zones; during some periods, entry into Plymouth was prohibited, and at other times, it was allowed during daytime only to those with a means of rapid escape. The last time that access was legally allowed to Plymouth during daytime was 16 June 1997, with the exception of essential services. On 25 June 1997, a further massive eruption produced pyroclastic surges that killed 19 people and reached nearly to the island's airport on the eastern side of the island, which had remained open until that time.

Between 4–8 August 1997, a further series of large eruptions destroyed approximately 80% of the town, burying it under 1.4 metres (4.6 ft) of ash. This hot material burned many of the buildings, making habitation nearly impossible for many of the residents.

The pyroclastic flows, lava, ash and other volcanic rock types were mostly compact, having a density similar to that of concrete. The removal of the overburden would have required the use of explosives, bulldozers and other resources too expensive for widespread use. It was anticipated that the soil underneath the hardened mud and lava would have been scorched and left completely non-arable by the intense heat of the pyroclastic flows.

The government ordered the evacuation of Plymouth, with the Royal Navy assisting by taking the population to safety. The entire southern half of the island was declared an exclusion zone because of the continuing volcanic activity at the Soufrière Hills. The government of the island was moved north to the town of Brades. As of 2013, a new port and capital are under construction at Little Bay, on the island's northwest coast. Daytime access to Plymouth has been permitted for some activities since about 2015, including sand and gravel extraction for construction projects.

The total destruction of Plymouth caused severe economic problems for the island of Montserrat. Plymouth had been by far the largest settlement on the island, with a population of around 4,000 inhabitants, and as such had been the site of almost all the island's shops and services, in addition to having been its seat of government.

Some of the lost facilities were subsequently rebuilt elsewhere on Montserrat, but this did not prevent emigration. Between 1995 and 2000, two-thirds of the island's total population was forced to flee, many of whom settled in the United Kingdom, leaving fewer than 1,200 people resident on the island as of 1997. The population figure has risen to nearly 5,000 by 2016.

== Geography ==
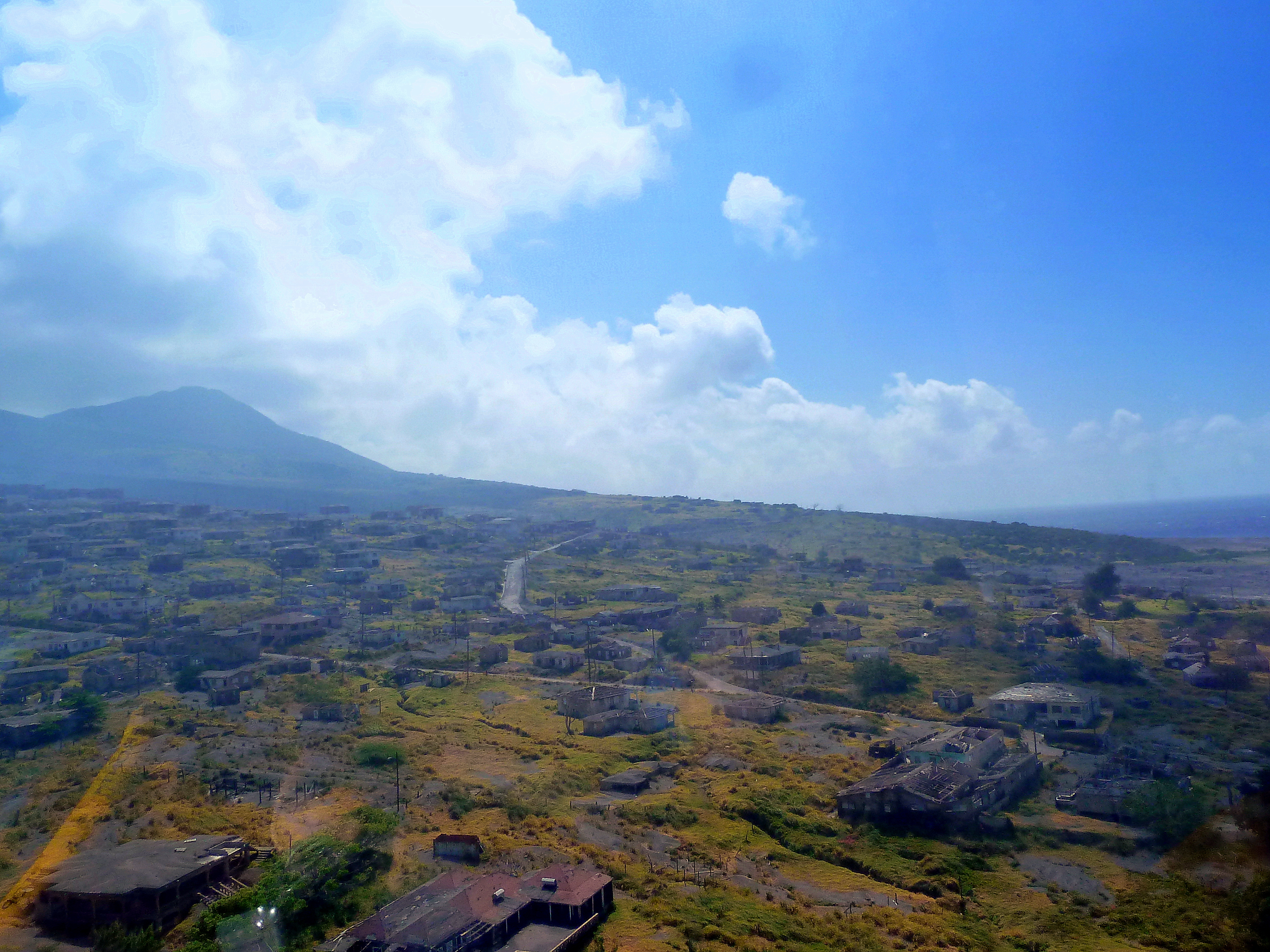
Plymouth in 2012, showing the revegetation of the zone buried by ash.

Plymouth is situated on the lower southwest slope of the Soufrière Hills Volcano. It is well within the volcanic exclusion zone, which is considered wholly uninhabitable.

=== Climate ===
Plymouth has a hot semiarid climate (Köppen: BSh).

Climate data for Plymouth
Month	Jan	Feb	Mar	Apr	May	Jun	Jul	Aug	Sep	Oct	Nov	Dec	Year
Mean daily maximum °C (°F)	25.7 (78.3)	25.5 (77.9)	25.5 (77.9)	26.1 (79.0)	26.9 (80.4)	27.5 (81.5)	27.7 (81.9)	28.1 (82.6)	28.2 (82.8)	27.9 (82.2)	27.3 (81.1)	26.5 (79.7)	26.9 (80.4)
Daily mean °C (°F)	25.2 (77.4)	24.9 (76.8)	25.0 (77.0)	25.6 (78.1)	26.4 (79.5)	27.0 (80.6)	27.1 (80.8)	27.4 (81.3)	27.5 (81.5)	27.3 (81.1)	26.7 (80.1)	25.9 (78.6)	26.3 (79.4)
Mean daily minimum °C (°F)	24.5 (76.1)	24.3 (75.7)	24.4 (75.9)	24.9 (76.8)	25.7 (78.3)	26.2 (79.2)	26.3 (79.3)	26.5 (79.7)	26.6 (79.9)	26.4 (79.5)	25.9 (78.6)	25.1 (77.2)	25.6 (78.0)
Average precipitation mm (inches)	29.5 (1.16)	23.4 (0.92)	17.5 (0.69)	23.9 (0.94)	36.0 (1.42)	34.6 (1.36)	69.1 (2.72)	89.8 (3.54)	80.0 (3.15)	73.8 (2.91)	68.8 (2.71)	40.1 (1.58)	586.5 (23.1)
Source: Weather.Directory

== Transport ==
The airport serving the island of Montserrat, W. H. Bramble Airport, was shut down completely by 1997 and subsequently destroyed as it was buried in volcanic ash. A new airport, John A. Osborne Airport, opened in 2005 at Gerald's, near Brades in the north of the island.

== Education ==
In the pre-1997 period, it was served by Plymouth Primary School, and Plymouth Junior Secondary School.

== Notable people ==
- Margaret Dyer-Howe, politician
- Donervon Daniels, footballer
- Alex Daley, footballer
- Kadiff Kirwan, actor
- Arrow, Calypsonian

== Gallery ==
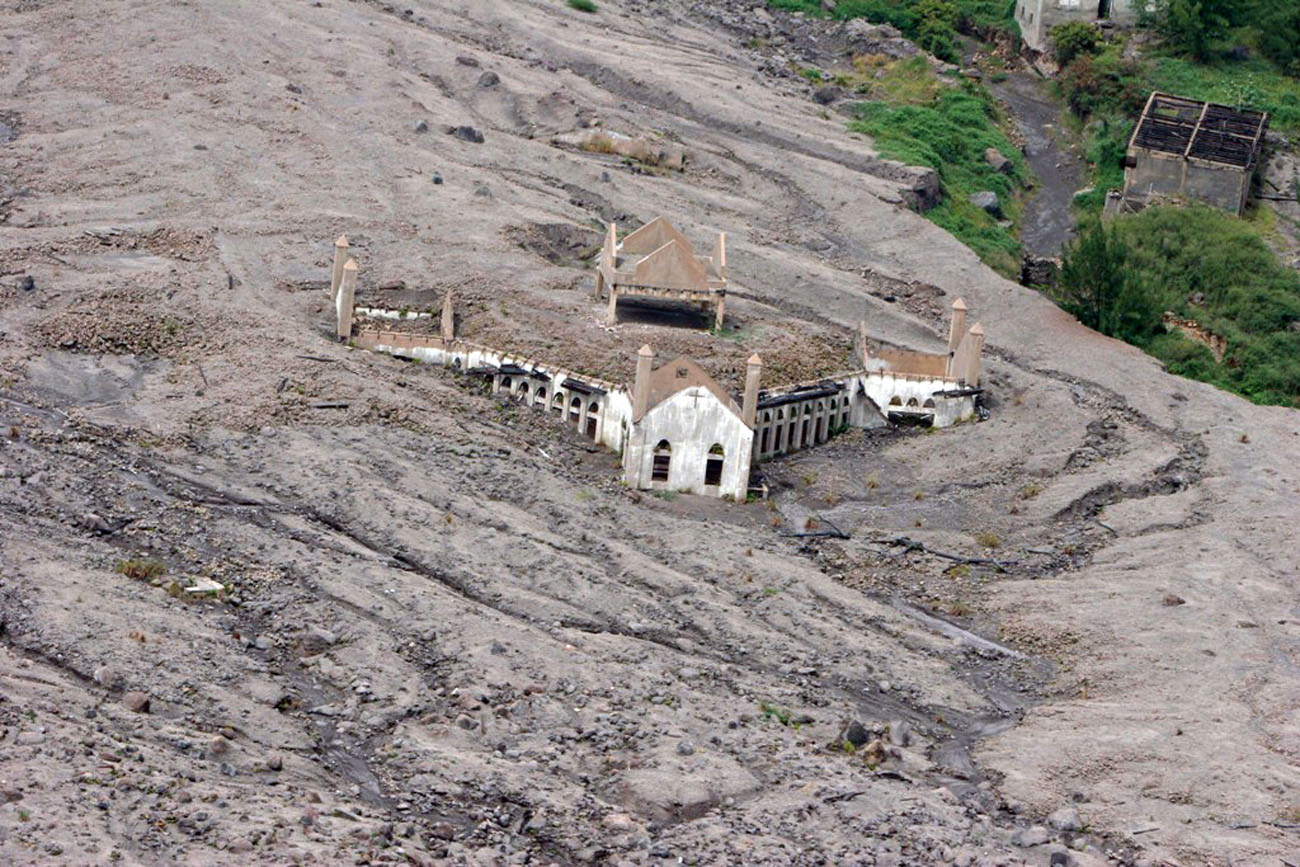
A church after the eruption.

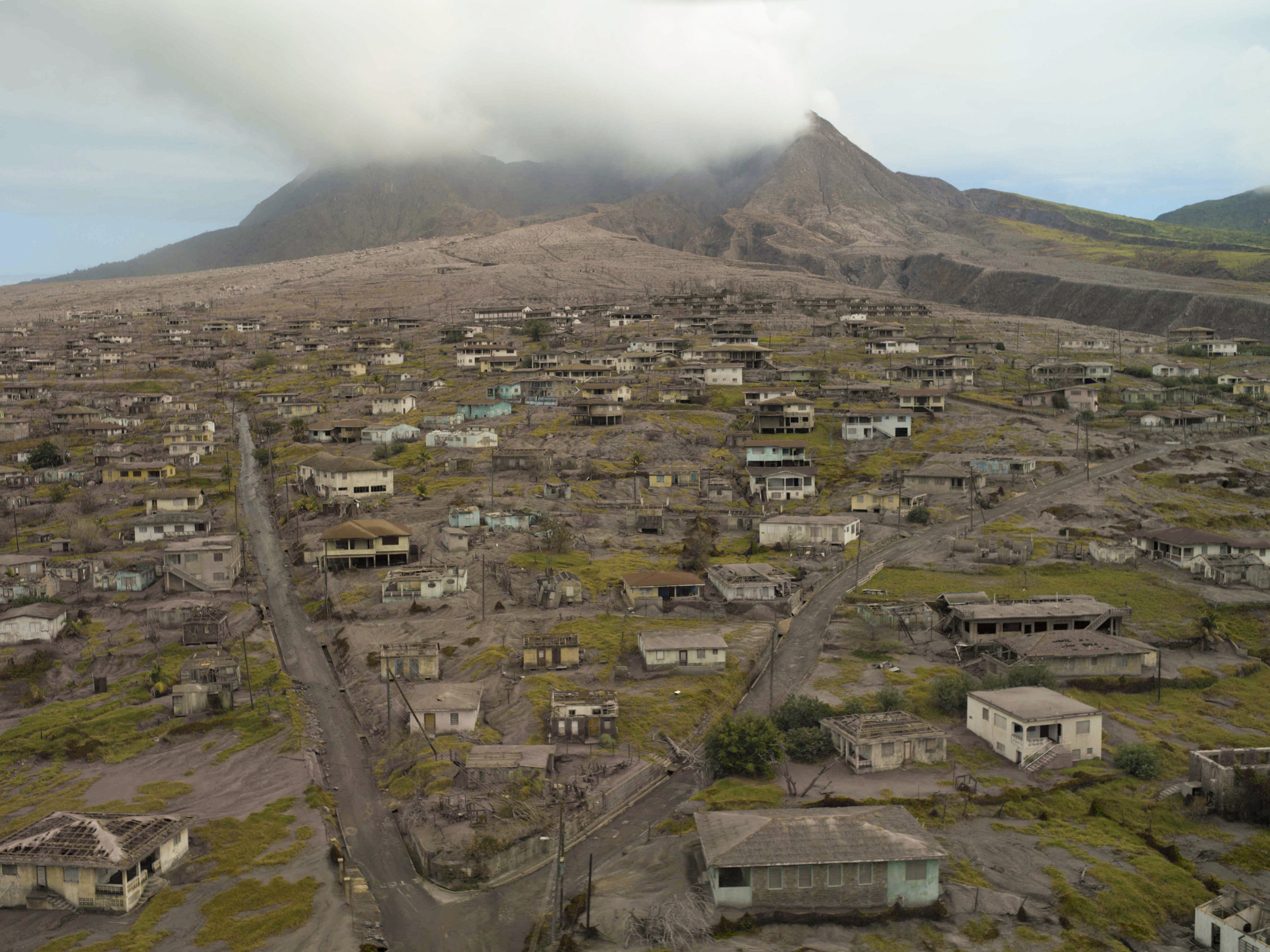
A residential area after the eruption.

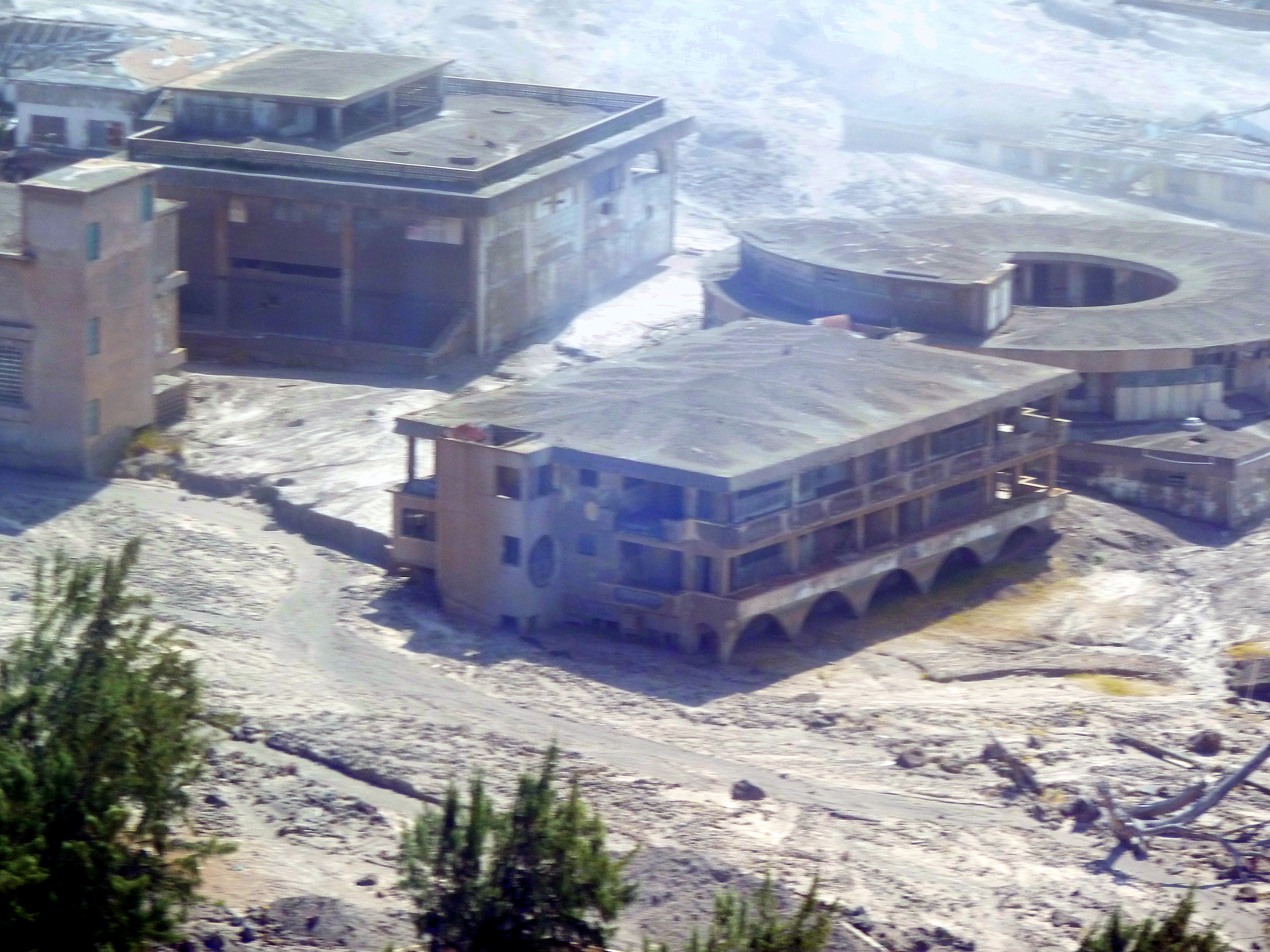
Partially submerged buildings

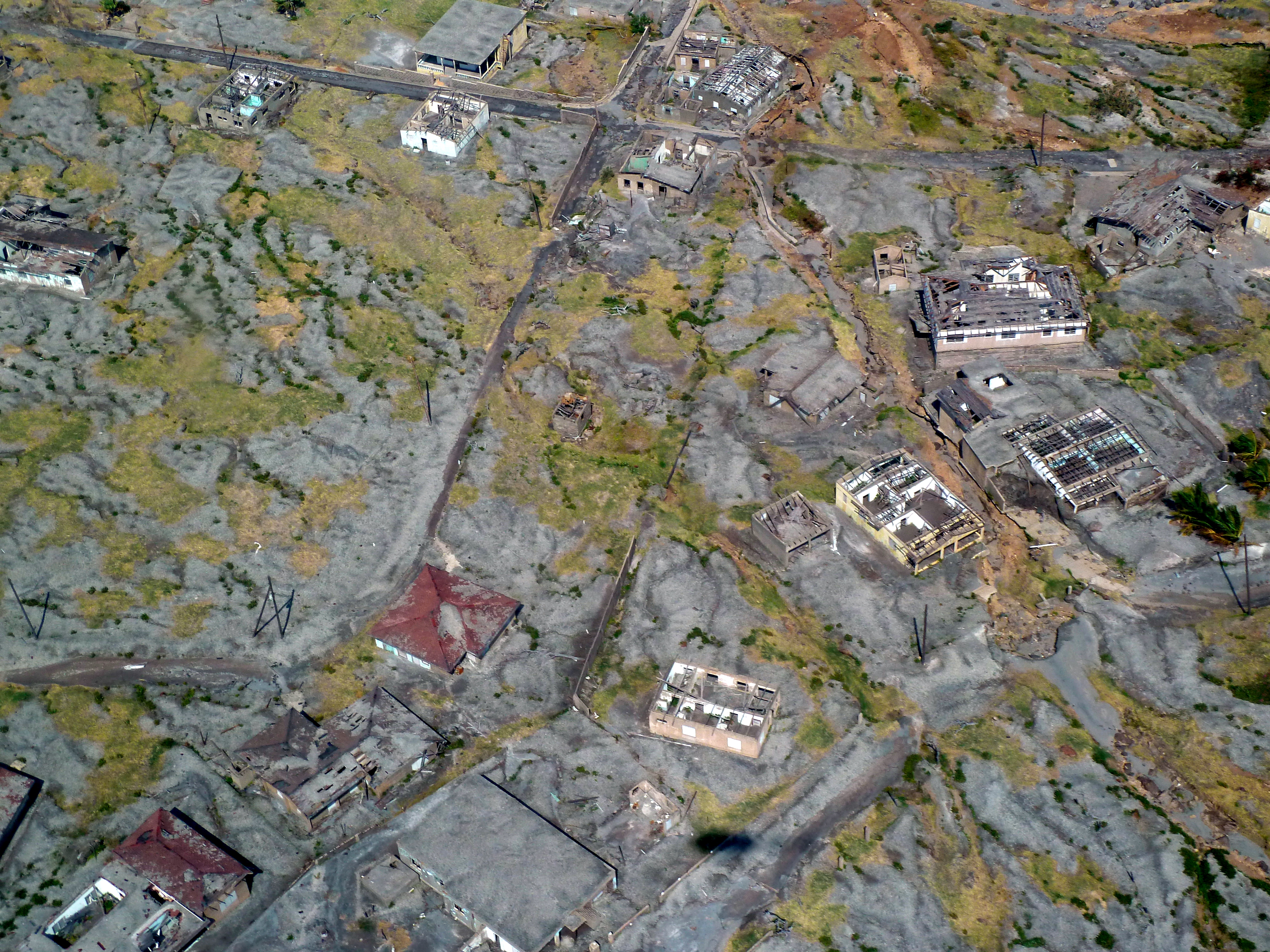
An aerial photo showing common roof damage

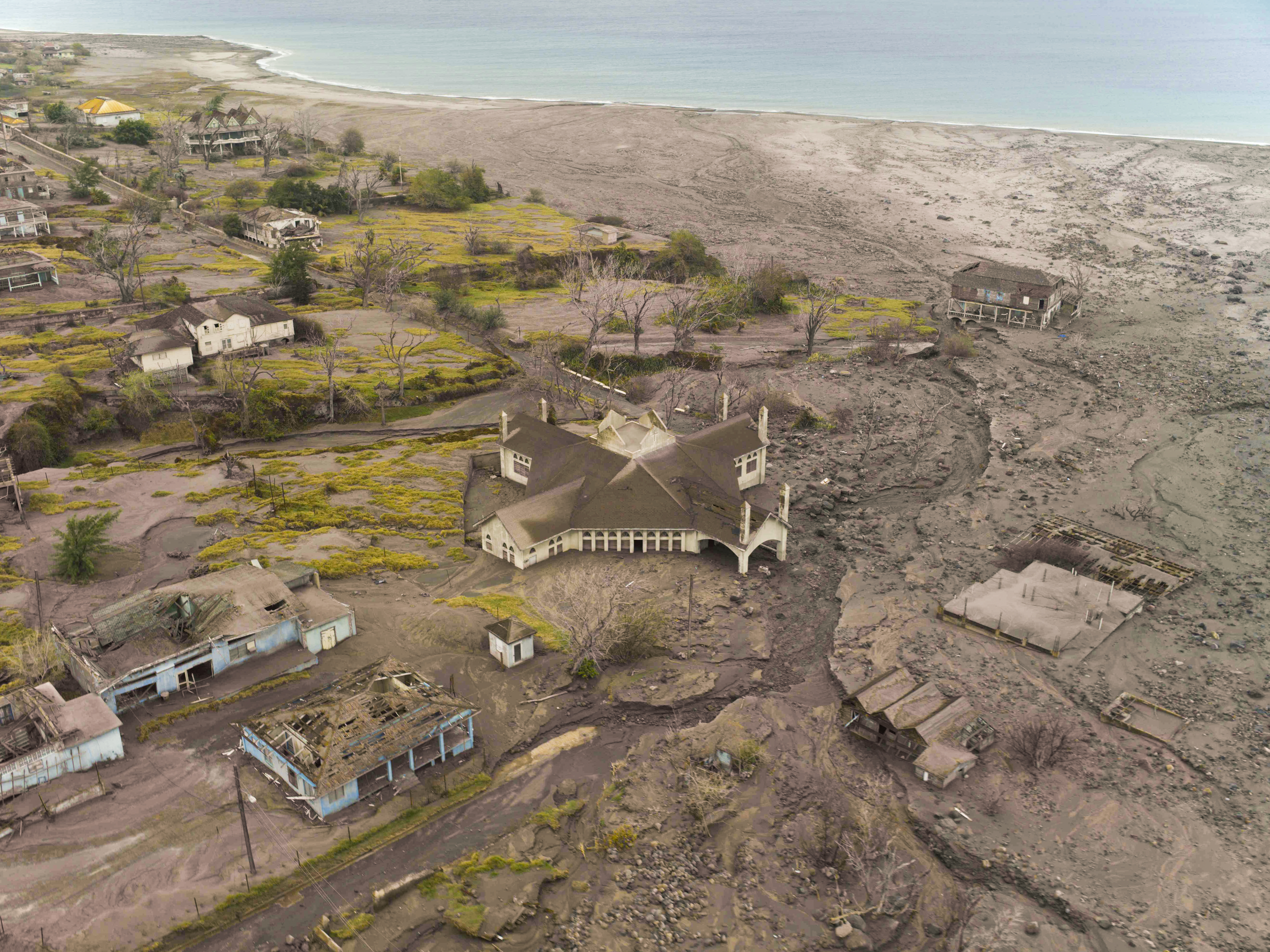
Partially buried buildings near the shore.

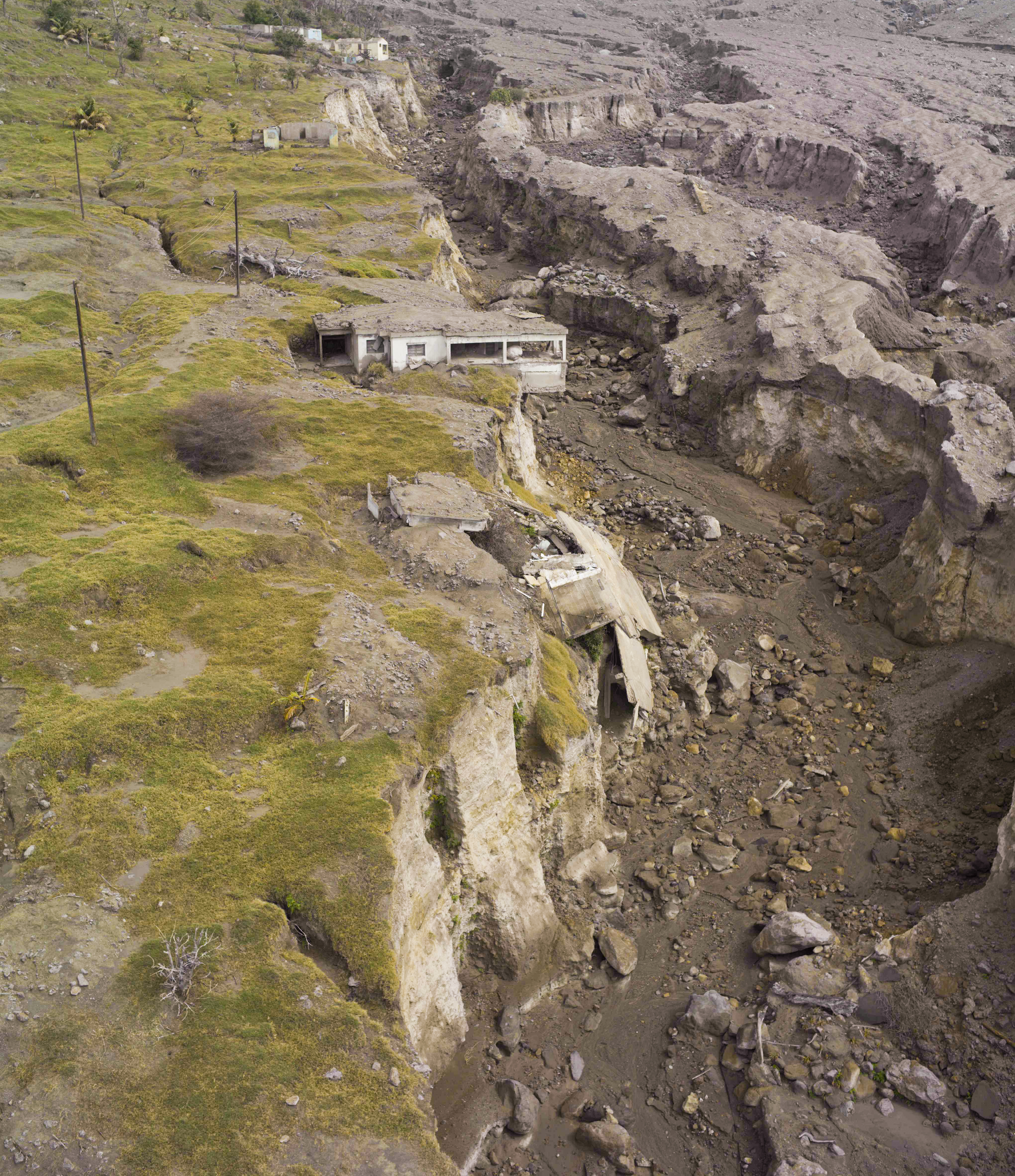
A house on the edge of a newly formed cliff.

Plymouth prior in August 1995 with Soufrière Hills in the background

== See also ==
- List of settlements abandoned after the 1997 Soufrière Hills eruption
