= Little Bay, Montserrat =

Future capital of Montserrat

Little Bay
- Planned town
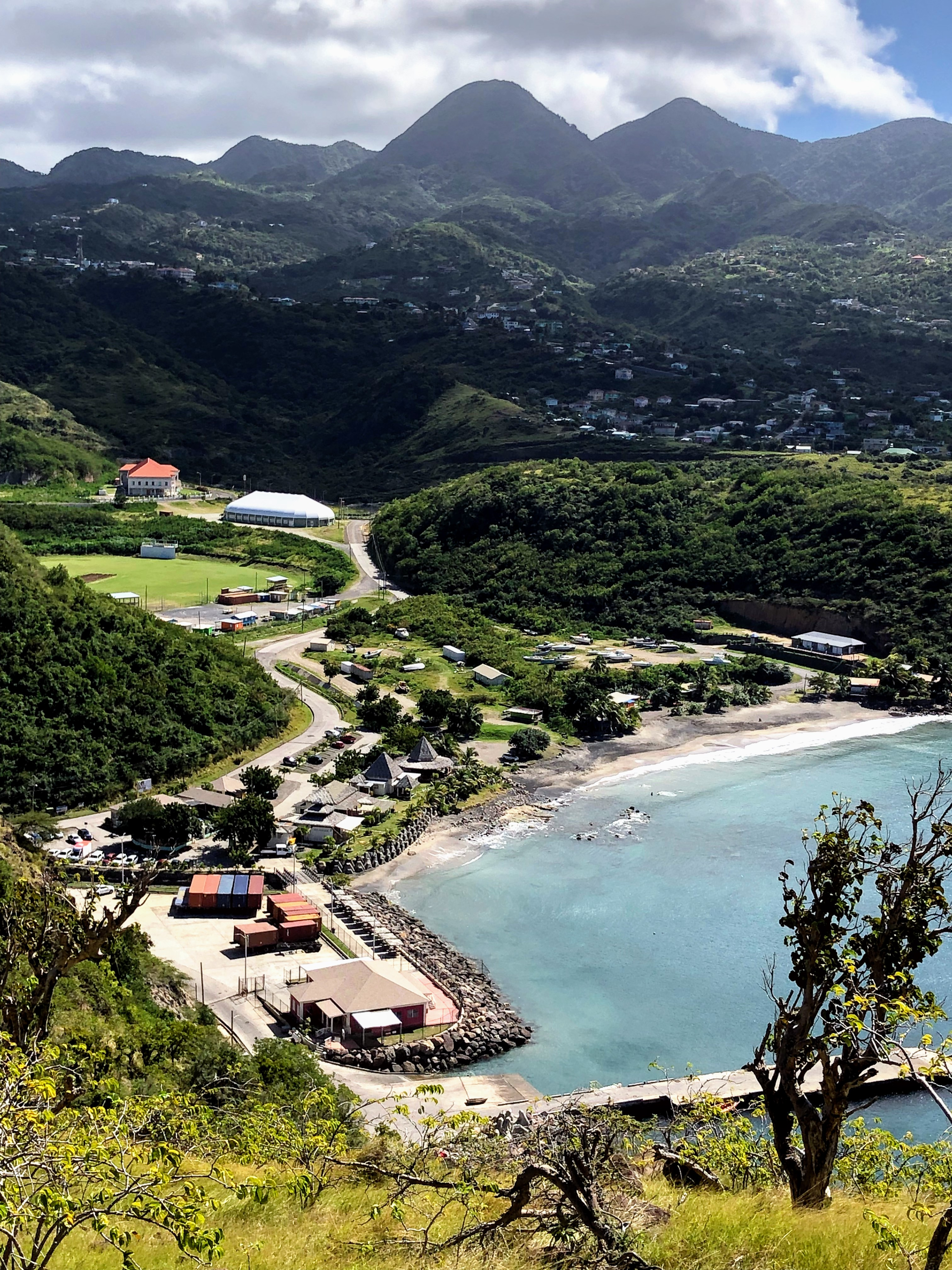
- View of the port and town of Little Bay, Montserrat, looking south from Rendezvous Bluff.

- Location of Little Bay within Montserrat Little Bay (the Caribbean)
- Coordinates: 16°48′10.4″N 62°12′17.6″W
- Country: United Kingdom
- Overseas territory: Montserrat
- Time zone: UTC-4 (Atlantic)
- Website: mdc.ms/infrastructure/

Little Bay is a port town under construction which is intended to be the future capital of the island of Montserrat, a British Overseas Territory in the Caribbean. It is adjacent to the town of Brades, where government headquarters are currently located.

== History ==
The de jure capital of Montserrat at Plymouth, in the south of the island, was abandoned in 1997 after it was buried by the 1995 eruption of the Soufrière Hills volcano. Interim government buildings have since been built at Brades, becoming the temporary capital in 1998. Although this move was initially intended to be temporary, it has remained the island's de facto capital ever since.

The project is funded by the Government of Montserrat and the UK Government's Department for International Development. Following the death in 1997 of Diana, Princess of Wales, the island authorities began the process for seeking approval to name the new capital Port Diana.

In 2012, a plan to construct governmental buildings was decided, and, among other things, a new port is to be built, which should be able to handle ships up to a size of 300 metres (1,000 ft). According to the island state, that should also benefit cruise ship traffic. The total cost was estimated to be at least US$200 million (£126.61 million), about half of which relates to the port. In 2013, initial work began to prepare the area for construction. In May 2019, construction of the port began. In June 2022, the United Kingdom Caribbean Infrastructure Fund (UKCIF), administered by the Caribbean Development Bank, granted £28.3 million (equivalent to £31.47 million or US$40.22 million in 2024) to fund the construction of the harbour.
