= Brades =

Capital of Montserrat

Brades Brades Estate
- Seat of government
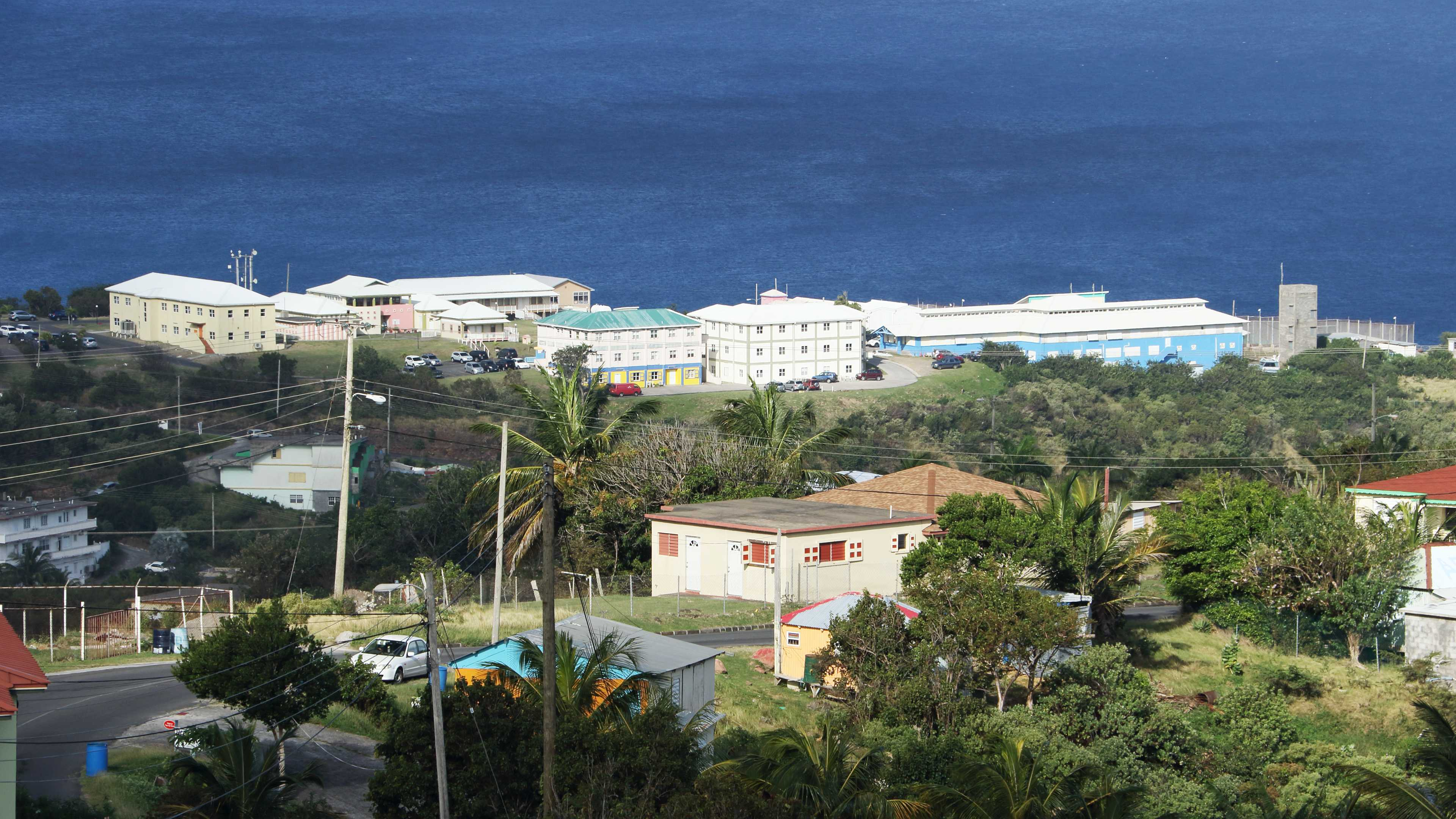
- Temporary administration in Brades, 2019

- Location within Montserrat Location within North America
- Coordinates: 16°47′34″N 62°12′38″W
- Sovereign state: United Kingdom
- Overseas territory: Montserrat

Population
  - Total: 1,000
- Time zone: UTC−04:00 (Atlantic)

Brades (/ˈbreɪdz/; also Brades Estate) is a town and the seat of government of Montserrat since 1998 with an approximate population of 1,000.

== History ==
The former capital of Montserrat at Plymouth in the south of the island was abandoned in 1997 after it was buried by the eruptions of the Soufrière Hills volcano which began erupting in 1995. Interim government buildings have since been built at Brades, becoming the new temporary capital in 1998, and formally designated as the capital in November 2025.. The move is intended to be temporary, but it has remained the island's de facto capital ever since. Several names have been suggested for a new official capital being constructed in the Little Bay area. These include Port Diana, in memory of Diana, Princess of Wales,⁣ and St Patrick's,⁣ to commemorate the 17 March Uprising and to attract Irish-American tourists.

== Geography ==
Map of Montserrat, with Brades highlighted and including the "Exclusion Zone".

Brades is located at the northwest end of Montserrat. It lies to the north of St Peter's and Bunkum Bay, in the vicinity of Carr's Bay and Little Bay. The main road of the island reaches its furthest north at Carr's Bay and then heads southeast, past the airport in the centre of the island. The village of Davy Hill lies off the main road in proximity to the northeast; The Collins River passes between the settlements and flows into Little Bay. To the northeast of Brades, in the centre, the island becomes hilly, reaching an elevation of 403 m at the peak of Silver Hill.

== Economy ==
Brades contains several small shops, a bank, a branch of the Royal Bank of Canada on the Brades Main Road, government offices, a post office, a library, and a pharmacy. Runaway Travel, the largest and most comprehensive travel agency on Montserrat, is based in Brades. The firm Gas Grant Enterprises and Trading has its offices in Brades, as does Montserrat Airways and the Montserrat Tourist Board. The Attorney-General's Chambers are situated at 3 Farara Plaza in Brades.

== Education ==
Schools in Brades include:

- Brades Nursery (government)
- Brades Primary School (government)
  - The Methodist Church built the school in 1966. Further additions and renovation were done by the Montserrat government. In 2009 the school was overpopulated; it had 151 students that year.
- St. Augustine Catholic Primary School (private)

Secondary students attend Montserrat Secondary School in Salem and sixth formers attend Montserrat Community College in Salem.

== Climate ==
Brades has a tropical rainforest climate (Köppen: Af).

Climate data for Brades
Month	Jan	Feb	Mar	Apr	May	Jun	Jul	Aug	Sep	Oct	Nov	Dec	Year
Mean daily maximum °C (°F)	25.7 (78.3)	25.5 (77.9)	25.5 (77.9)	26.1 (79.0)	26.9 (80.4)	27.5 (81.5)	27.7 (81.9)	28.1 (82.6)	28.2 (82.8)	27.9 (82.2)	27.3 (81.1)	26.5 (79.7)	26.9 (80.4)
Daily mean °C (°F)	25.2 (77.4)	24.9 (76.8)	25.0 (77.0)	25.6 (78.1)	26.4 (79.5)	27.0 (80.6)	27.1 (80.8)	27.4 (81.3)	27.5 (81.5)	27.3 (81.1)	26.7 (80.1)	25.9 (78.6)	26.3 (79.4)
Mean daily minimum °C (°F)	24.5 (76.1)	24.3 (75.7)	24.4 (75.9)	24.9 (76.8)	25.7 (78.3)	26.2 (79.2)	26.3 (79.3)	26.5 (79.7)	26.6 (79.9)	26.4 (79.5)	25.9 (78.6)	25.1 (77.2)	25.6 (78.0)
Average precipitation mm (inches)	29.5 (1.16)	23.4 (0.92)	17.5 (0.69)	23.9 (0.94)	36.0 (1.42)	34.6 (1.36)	69.1 (2.72)	89.8 (3.54)	80.0 (3.15)	73.8 (2.91)	68.8 (2.71)	40.1 (1.58)	586.5 (23.1)
Source: Weather.Directory

== Demographics ==
Brades Estate had a population of 393 in 2018. Major ethnic groups in the village included Africans (87.8%), Hispanics (0.3%), mixed (6.4%), and others (5.6%). 55.2% of the population had been born in Montserrat, with other places of birth including Guyana (7.9%), Jamaica (16.0%), unknown (0.8%), and the rest of the world (20.1%). Major religions included Pentecostalists (22.9%) and Methodists (17.6%).

== Notable person ==
- Maizie Williams, singer, model and dancer.
