= Montserrat =

British Overseas Territory in the Caribbean

- British Overseas Territory
- Flag Coat of arms
- Motto: "A people of excellence, moulded by nature, nurtured by God."
- Anthem: "God Save the King" (Note: "God Save the King" is the national anthem by custom, not statute, and there is no authorised version. Typically only the first verse is usually sung, although the second verse is also often sung as well at state and public events. The words King, he, him, his, used at present, are replaced by Queen, she, her when the monarch is female.)
- Territorial anthem: "Motherland"
- Location of Montserrat (circled in red)

- Topographic map of Montserrat showing the "exclusion zone" due to volcanic activity, and the new airport in the north. The roads and settlements in the exclusion zone have mostly been conquered by natural forces.
- Sovereignty: United Kingdom
- English settlement: 1632
- Treaty of Paris: 3 September 1783
- Federation: 3 January 1958
- Separate colony: 31 May 1962
- Capital: Brades; Plymouth (former) (Note: Abandoned in 1997, following a volcanic eruption.); Little Bay (under construction); 16°45′N 62°12′W
- Government seat and largest town: Brades
- Official languages: English
- Demonym(s): Montserratian
- Government: Parliamentary dependency under a constitutional monarchy
  - Monarch: Charles III
  - Governor: Harriet Cross
  - Premier: Reuben Meade
- Legislature: Legislative Assembly

Government of the United Kingdom
  - Minister: Uma Kumaran

Area
  - Total: 102 km^{2} (39 sq mi)
  - Water (%): negligible
- Highest elevation: 1,050 m (3,440 ft)

Population
  - 2024 estimate: 4,399 (194th)
  - 2018 census: 4,649 (intercensal count)
  - Density: 46/km^{2} (119.1/sq mi) (not ranked)
- GDP (PPP): 2014 estimate
  - Total: US$63 million
  - Per capita: US$12,384
- GDP (nominal): 2024 estimate
  - Total: EC$230.71 million (US$85.8 million)
  - Per capita: EC$52,446 (US$19,509)
- Currency: East Caribbean dollar (XCD)
- Time zone: UTC-4:00 (AST)
- Driving side: Left
- ISO 3166 code: MS
- Internet TLD: .ms
- Website: https://www.gov.ms/

Montserrat (/ˌmɒntsəˈræt/ MONT-sə-RAT, locally /ˈmɒntsəræt/) is a British Overseas Territory in the Caribbean. It is part of the Leeward Islands, the northern portion of the Lesser Antilles chain of the West Indies. Montserrat is about 16 km (10 mi) long and 11 km (7 mi) wide, with roughly 40 km (25 mi) of coastline. It is nicknamed "The Emerald Isle of the Caribbean" both for its resemblance to coastal Ireland and for the Irish ancestry of many of its inhabitants. Montserrat is the only non-fully sovereign full member of the Caribbean Community and the Organisation of Eastern Caribbean States, although it is not the only dependency in the Caribbean.

On 18 July 1995, the previously dormant Soufrière Hills volcano in the southern end of the island became active, and its eruptions destroyed Plymouth, Montserrat's Georgian-era capital city situated on the west coast. Between 1995 and 2000, two-thirds of the island's population was forced to flee, mostly to the United Kingdom, leaving fewer than 1,200 people on the island in 1997. The population had increased to nearly 5,000 by 2016. The volcanic activity continues, mostly affecting the vicinity of Plymouth, including its docks, and the eastern side of the island around the former W. H. Bramble Airport, the remnants of which were buried by flows from further volcanic activity on 11 February 2010.

An exclusion zone was imposed, encompassing the southern part of the island as far north as parts of the Belham Valley, because of the size of the existing volcanic dome and the resulting possibility of pyroclastic activity. Visitors are generally not permitted to enter the exclusion zone, but a view of destroyed Plymouth can be seen from the top of Garibaldi Hill in Isles Bay. The volcano has been relatively quiet since early 2010 and continues to be closely monitored by the Montserrat Volcano Observatory.

In 2015, it was announced that planning would begin on a new town and port at Little Bay on the northwest coast of the island, and the centre of government and businesses was moved temporarily to Brades. After a number of delays, including Hurricanes Irma and Maria in 2017 and the COVID-19 pandemic beginning in early 2020, the Little Bay Port Development Project, a £28 million project funded by the UK and the Caribbean Development Bank, began in June 2022.

== Etymology ==
In 1493, Christopher Columbus named the island Santa María de Montserrate, after the Virgin of Montserrat of the Monastery of Montserrat near Barcelona in Catalonia, Spain. Montserrat means "serrated mountain" in Catalan.

== History ==
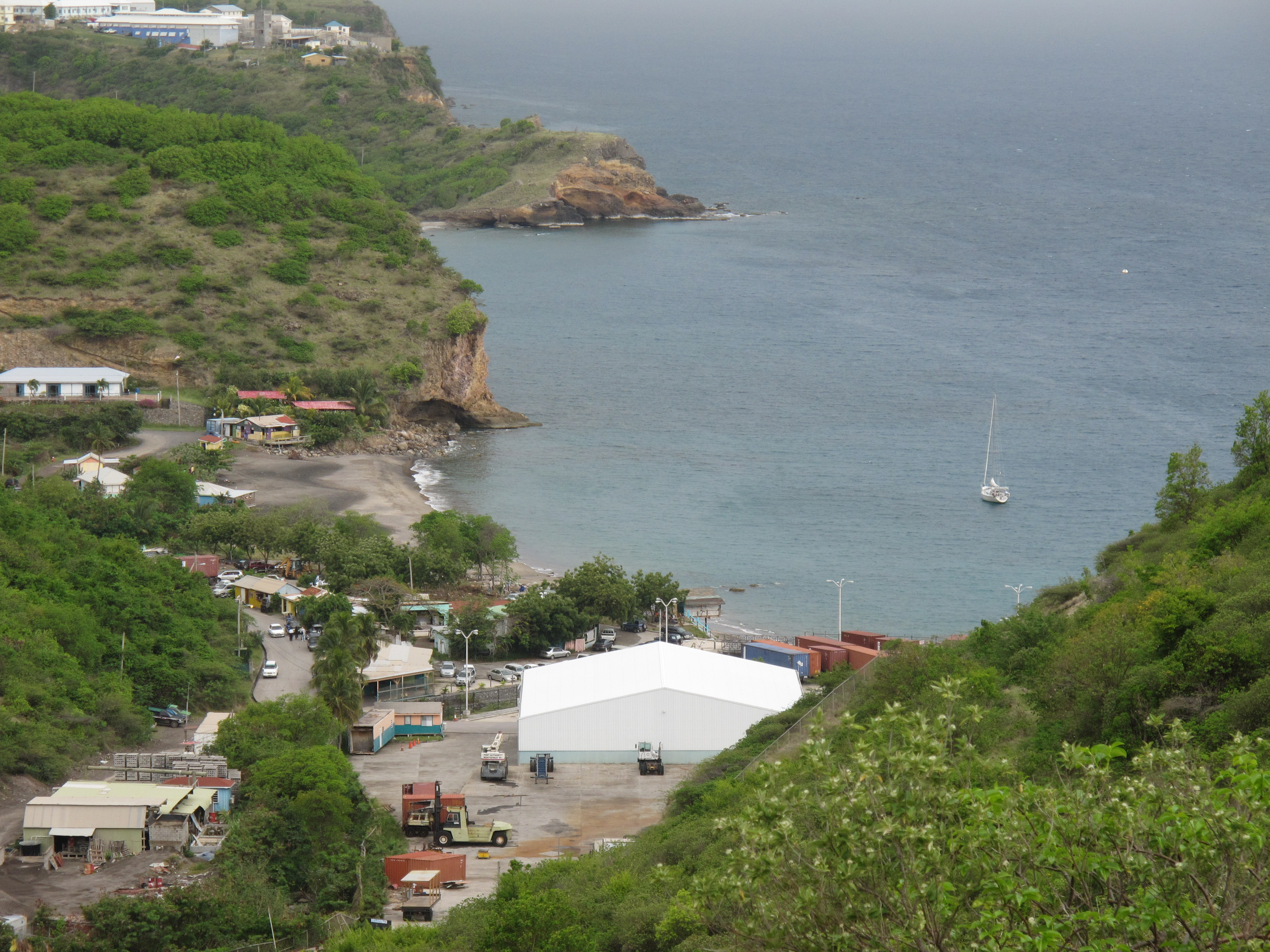
A view of half of the coastline of Little Bay, and a glimpse of Carrs Bay, taken from partway up the headland between Little Bay and Rendezvous Bay, 2012

Map of Montserrat (top) and Plymouth (bottom) in 1869

=== Pre-colonial era ===
Archaeological field work in 2012 in Montserrat's Centre Hills indicated that there had been an Archaic (pre-Arawak) occupation between 2000 and 500 BC. Later coastal sites showed the presence of the Saladoid culture (until 550 AD). The Indigenous Caribs are believed to have called the island Alliouagana, meaning 'Land of the Prickly Bush'.

In 2016, nine petroglyphs were discovered by local residents hiking in a wooded area near Soldier Ghaut. Another was discovered in 2018 in the same area of the island. The carvings are believed to be 1,000–1,500 years old.

The Amerindians came to the island via up the chain of the Lesser Antilles from the vicinity of Venezuela.

=== Early European period ===
In November 1493, Christopher Columbus passed Montserrat on his second voyage, after being told that the island was unoccupied because of raids by the Caribs.

A number of Irishmen settled in Montserrat in 1632. Most came from nearby Saint Kitts at the instigation of the island's governor and the colony's founder Sir Thomas Warner, with more settlers arriving later from Virginia. The first settlers "appear to have been cultivators, each working his own little farm".

The preponderance of Protestant Anglo-Irish (Irish of British descent) in the first wave of European settlers led a leading legal scholar to remark that a "nice question" is whether the original settlers took with them the law of the Kingdom of Ireland insofar as it differed from the law of the Kingdom of England.

The Irish being historical allies of the French, especially in their qualified disdain of the English, invited the French to claim the island in 1666, although no troops were sent by France to maintain control. The French attacked and briefly occupied the island in the late 1660s; it was captured shortly afterwards by the English, and English control of the island was confirmed under the Treaty of Breda the following year. Despite the seizing by force of the island by the French, the island's legal status is that of a "colony acquired by settlement", as the French gave up their claim to the island at Breda.

A neo-feudal colony developed amongst the so-called "redlegs". The Protestant Anglo-Irish colonists began to transport both Sub-Saharan African slaves and Catholic Irish indentured servants for labour, as was common to most Caribbean islands. By the late 18th century, numerous plantations had been developed on the island.

=== 18th century ===
There was a brief French attack on Montserrat in 1712. On 17 March 1768, a slave rebellion failed but their efforts were remembered. Slavery was abolished in 1834. In 1985, the people of Montserrat made St Patrick's Day a ten-day public holiday to commemorate the uprising. Festivities celebrate the culture and history of Montserrat in song, dance, food and traditional costumes.

In 1782, during the American Revolutionary War, as America's first ally, France captured Montserrat in their war of support of the Americans. The French, not intending to colonise the island, agreed to return the island to Great Britain under the 1783 Treaty of Paris.

=== New crops and politics ===
In 1834, Britain abolished slavery in Montserrat and its other territories.

During the nineteenth century, falling sugar prices had an adverse effect on the island's economy, as Brazil and other nations competed in the trade.

The first lime tree orchards on the island were planted in 1852 by a local planter, Mr Burke. In 1857, the British philanthropist Joseph Sturge bought a sugar estate to prove that it was economically viable to employ paid labour rather than use slaves. Numerous members of the Sturge family bought additional land. In 1869, the family established the Montserrat Company Limited and planted Key lime trees; started the commercial production of lime juice, with more than 100,000 gallons produced annually by 1895; set up a school; and sold parcels of land to the inhabitants of the island. The pure lime juice was transported in casks to England, where it was clarified and bottled by Evans, Sons & Co, of Liverpool, with a trade mark on each bottle intended to guarantee quality to the public.

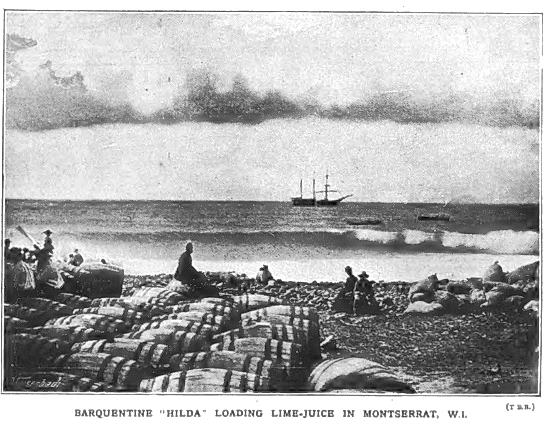
Barquentine 'Hilda' loading lime juice

Much of Montserrat came to be owned by smallholders.

From 1871 to 1958, the island was administered as part of the federal crown colony of the British Leeward Islands, becoming a province of the short-lived West Indies Federation from 1958 to 1962. The first Chief Minister of Montserrat was William Henry Bramble of the Montserrat Labour Party from 1960 to 1970; he worked to promote labour rights and boost tourism to the island, and Montserrat's original airport was named in his honour. Bramble's son, Percival Austin Bramble, was critical of the way tourist facilities were being constructed, and he set up his own party, the Progressive Democratic Party, which won the 1970 Montserratian general election. Percival Bramble served as Chief Minister from 1970 to 1978. The period 1978 to 1991 was dominated politically by Chief Minister John Osborne and his People's Liberation Movement (PLM). A brief flirtation with possibly declaring independence never materialised.

On 10 May 1991, the Caribbean Territories (Abolition of Death Penalty for Murder) Order 1991 came into force, formally abolishing the death penalty for murder on Montserrat.

Corruption allegations within the PLM party resulted in the collapse of the Osborne government in 1991, with Reuben Meade becoming the new chief minister, and early elections were called.

In 1995–1999, Montserrat was devastated by catastrophic volcanic eruptions in the Soufrière Hills, which destroyed the capital city of Plymouth, and necessitated the evacuation of a large part of the island. Many Montserratians emigrated abroad, mainly to the United Kingdom, although some have returned. The eruptions rendered the entire southern half of the island uninhabitable, and it is currently designated an Exclusion Zone with restricted access.

Criticism of the Montserratian government's response to the disaster led to the resignation of Chief Minister Bertrand Osborne in 1997 after only a year in office. He was replaced by David Brandt, who remained in office until 2001. Since leaving office, Brandt has been the subject of multiple criminal investigation into alleged sex offences with minors. He was found guilty of six counts of sexual exploitation and sentenced to fifteen years in July 2021.

John Osborne returned as Chief Minister following victory in the 2001 election. He was ousted by Lowell Lewis of the Montserrat Democratic Party in 2006. Reuben Meade returned to office in 2009 to 2014. During his term, the post of Chief Minister was replaced with that of Premier.

In the autumn of 2017, Montserrat was not affected by Hurricane Irma, and sustained only minor damage from Hurricane Maria.

In November 2019, Easton Taylor-Farrell of the Movement for Change and Prosperity party became the island's Premier, followed, again, by Meade in October 2024, now leader of the United Alliance party that he had founded earlier that year.

== Politics and government ==
Montserrat is an internally self-governing overseas territory of the United Kingdom. The United Nations Committee on Decolonization includes Montserrat on the United Nations list of non-self-governing territories. The island's head of state is King Charles III, represented by an appointed governor. Executive power is exercised by the government, whereas the premier is the head of government. The premier is appointed by the governor from among the members of the Legislative Assembly which consists of nine elected members. The leader of the party with a majority of seats is usually the one who is appointed. Legislative power is vested in both the government and the Legislative Assembly. The Assembly also includes two ex officio members, the attorney general and financial secretary.

The judiciary is independent of the executive and the legislature.

=== Administrative divisions ===
Parishes St. Peter St. Georges St. Anthony ◾Plymouth

For the purposes of local government, Montserrat is divided into three parishes. Going north to south, they are:

- Parish of Saint Peter
- Parish of Saint Georges
- Parish of Saint Anthony

The locations of settlements on the island have been vastly changed since the volcanic activity began. Only the Parish of Saint Peter in the northwest of the island is now inhabited, with a population of between 4,000 and 6,000, the other two parishes being still too dangerous to inhabit.

A significantly more up-to-date statistical division would be the 3 census regions, primarily used for the population census. Going north to south, these are:

- Northern Region (2,369 pop.)
- Central Region (1,666 pop.)
- South of Nantes river (887 pop.)

For census purposes, these are further divided into 23 enumeration districts.

=== Police ===
Policing is primarily the responsibility of the Royal Montserrat Police Service.

=== Military and defence ===
The defence of Montserrat is the responsibility of the United Kingdom. The Royal Navy generally deploys a River-class offshore patrol vessel in the Caribbean and from time-to-time may send another Royal Navy or Royal Fleet Auxiliary ship as a part of the Atlantic Patrol (NORTH) tasking. These ships' main mission in the region is to maintain British sovereignty for the overseas territories, provide humanitarian aid and disaster relief during disasters such as hurricanes, which are common in the area, and conduct counter-narcotics operations. In October 2023, the destroyer HMS Dauntless (which had temporarily replaced the River-class patrol vessel HMS Medway on her Caribbean tasking), visited the territory in order to assist local authorities in preparing for the climax of the hurricane season.

==== Royal Montserrat Defence Force ====
The Royal Montserrat Defence Force is the home defence unit of the British Overseas Territory of Montserrat. Raised in 1899, the unit is today a reduced force of about forty volunteer soldiers, primarily concerned with civil defence and ceremonial duties. The unit has a historical association with the Irish Guards.

== Communications ==
The island is served by landline telephones, fully digitalised, with 3000 subscribers and by mobile cellular, with an estimated number of 5000 handsets in use. An estimated 2860 users have internet access. These are July 2016 estimates. Public radio service is provided by Radio Montserrat. There is a single television broadcaster, PTV. Cable and satellite television service is available.

The UK postcode for directing mail to Montserrat is MSR followed by four digits according to the destination town; for example, the postcode for Little Bay is MSR1120.

== Geography ==
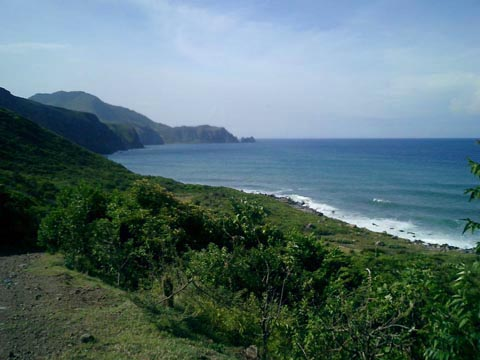
Montserrat's coastline

The island of Montserrat is located approximately 25 miles (40 km) southwest of Antigua, 13 miles (21 km) southeast of Redonda (a small island owned by Antigua and Barbuda), and 35 miles (56 km) northwest of the French overseas region of Guadeloupe. Beyond Redonda lies the island of Nevis (which is part of the federation of St Kitts and Nevis), about 30 miles (48 km) to the north-west.

Montserrat comprises 104 km^{2} (40 sq mi) and is gradually increasing owing to the buildup of volcanic deposits on the southeast coast. The island is 16 km (9.9 mi) long and 11 km (6.8 mi) wide and consists of a mountainous interior surrounded by a flatter littoral region, with rock cliffs rising 15 to 30 m (49 to 98 ft) above the sea and a number of smooth bottomed sandy beaches scattered among coves on the western (Caribbean Sea) side of the island.

The major mountains are (from north to south) Silver Hill, Katy Hill in the Centre Hills range, the Soufrière Hills and the South Soufrière Hills. The Soufrière Hills volcano is the island's highest point; its pre-1995 height was 915 metres (3,002 ft). However, it has grown after the eruption due to the creation of a lava dome, with its current height being estimated at 1,050 metres (3,440 ft).

The 2011 estimate by the Central Intelligence Agency (CIA) indicates that 30% of the island's land is classified as agricultural, 20% as arable, 25% as forest and the balance as "other".

Montserrat has a few tiny off-shore islands, such as Little Redonda off its north coast and Pinnacle Rock and Statue Rock off its east.

=== Volcano and exclusion zone ===
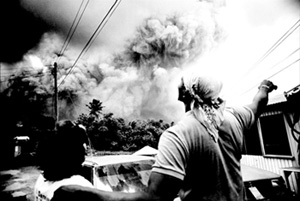
Eruption of the Soufrière Hills volcano on 22 September 1997

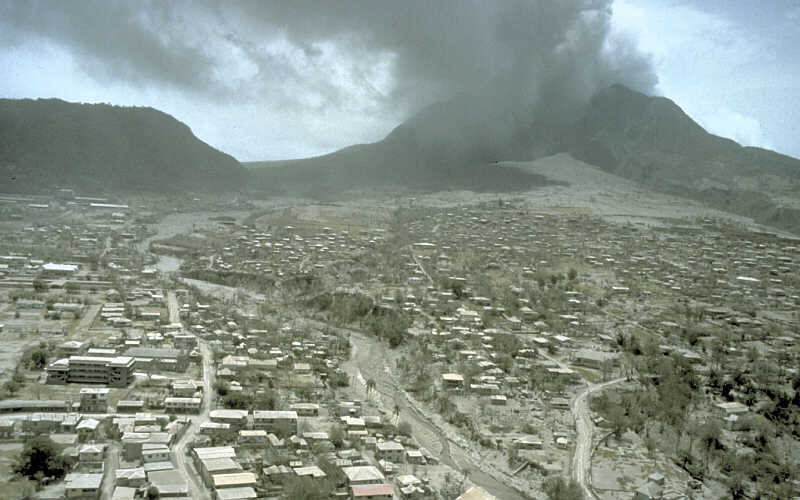
Plymouth City (former capital and major port of Montserrat) on 12 July 1997, after pyroclastic flows burned much of what was not covered in ash

False-colour time-lapse images of the Soufrière Hills volcanic dome collapse in 2010, from NASA

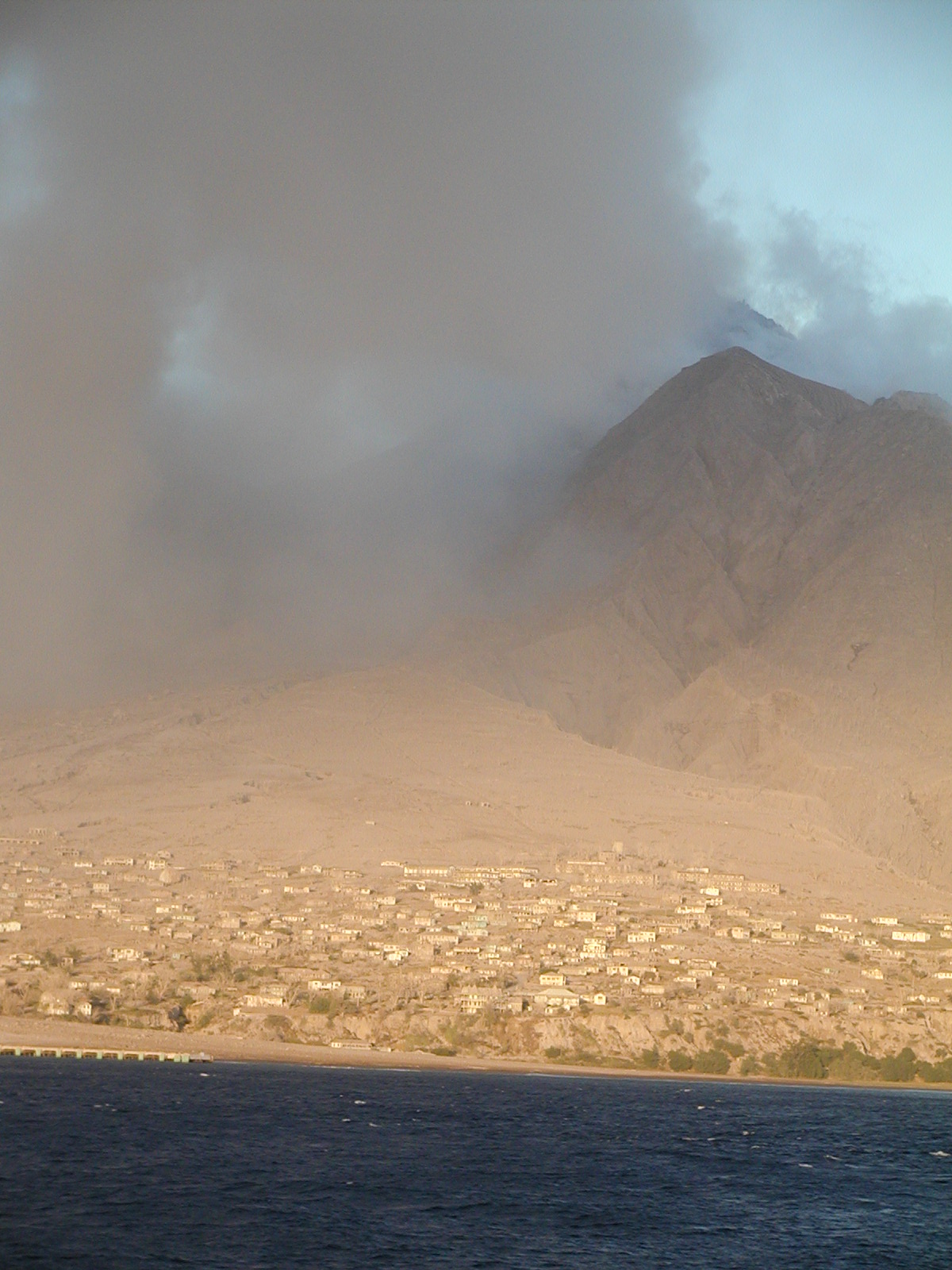
Devastated Plymouth City and volcano (2003)

In July 1995, Montserrat's Soufrière Hills volcano, dormant for centuries, erupted and soon buried the island's capital, Plymouth, in more than 12 metres (39 ft) of mud, destroyed its airport and docking facilities, and rendered the southern part of the island, now termed the exclusion zone, uninhabitable and not safe for travel. The southern part of the island was evacuated and visits are severely restricted. The exclusion zone also includes two sea areas adjacent to the land areas of most volcanic activity.

After the destruction of Plymouth and disruption of the economy, more than half of the population left the island, which also lacked housing. During the late 1990s, additional eruptions occurred. On 25 June 1997, a pyroclastic flow travelled down Mosquito Ghaut. This pyroclastic surge could not be restrained by the ghaut (a steep ravine leading to the sea) and spilled out of it, killing 19 people who were in the (officially evacuated) Streatham village area. Several others in the area suffered severe burns. The villages of Dyer's, Harris, Bethel, Spanish Pointe, Trants and parts of Brambles Village were also damaged from the pyroclastic flow

British nationality law has changed over time with respect to the status granted to Montserrat residents. In recognition of the disaster, in 1998, the people of Montserrat were granted full residency rights in the United Kingdom, allowing them to migrate if they chose. British citizenship was granted in 2002 to British Overseas Territories citizens in Montserrat and all but one other British Overseas Territory.

For a number of years in the early 2000s, the volcano's activity consisted mostly of infrequent ventings of ash into the uninhabited areas in the south. The ash falls occasionally extended into the northern and western parts of the island. In the most recent period of increased activity at the Soufrière Hills volcano, from November 2009 through February 2010, ash vented and there was a vulcanian explosion that sent pyroclastic flows down several sides of the mountain. Travel into parts of the exclusion zone was occasionally allowed, though only by a licence from the Royal Montserrat Police Force. Since 2014 the area has been split into multiple subzones with varying entry and use restrictions, based on volcanic activity: some areas even being (in 2020) open 24 hours and inhabited. The most dangerous zone, which includes the former capital, remains forbidden to casual visitors due to volcanic and other hazards, especially due to the lack of maintenance in destroyed areas. It is legal to visit this area when accompanied by a government-authorised guide.

The northern part of Montserrat has largely been unaffected by volcanic activity, and remains lush and green. In February 2005, Princess Anne officially opened what is now called the John A. Osborne Airport in the north. Since 2011, it handles several flights daily operated by Fly Montserrat Airways. Docking facilities are in place at Little Bay, where the new capital town is being constructed; the new government centre is at Brades, a short distance away.

=== Wildlife ===
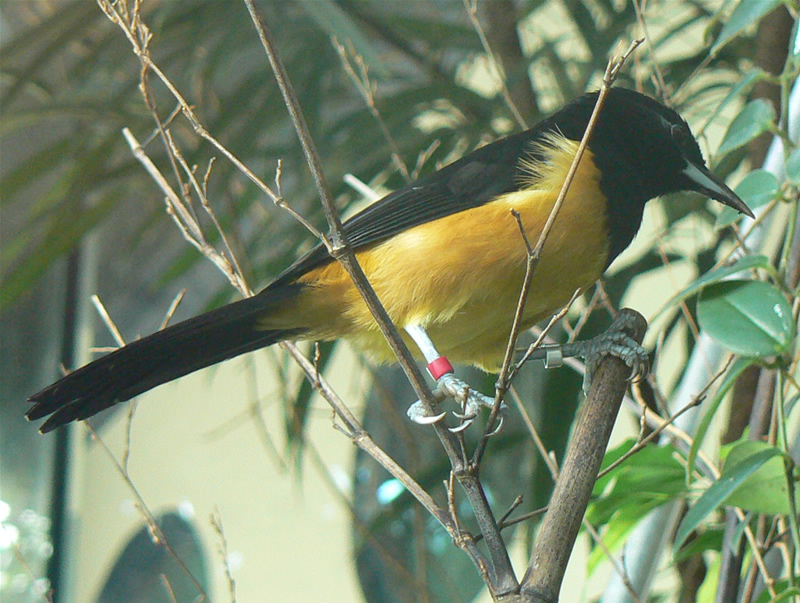
Montserrat oriole, the official bird of the island

Montserrat, like many isolated islands, is home to rare, endemic plant and animal species. Work undertaken by the Montserrat National Trust in collaboration with the Royal Botanic Gardens, Kew has centred on the conservation of pribby (Rondeletia buxifolia) in the Centre Hills region. Until 2006, this species was known only from one book about the vegetation of Montserrat. In 2006, conservationists also rescued several plants of the endangered Montserrat orchid (Epidendrum montserratense) from dead trees on the island and installed them in the security of the island's botanic garden.

Montserrat is also home to the critically endangered giant ditch frog (Leptodactylus fallax), known locally as the mountain chicken, found only in Montserrat and Dominica. The species has undergone catastrophic declines due to the amphibian disease Chytridiomycosis and the volcanic eruption in 1997. Experts from Durrell Wildlife Conservation Trust have been working with the Montserrat Department of Environment to conserve the frog in-situ in a project called "Saving the Mountain Chicken", and an ex-situ captive breeding population has been set up in partnership with Durrell Wildlife Conservation Trust, Zoological Society of London, Chester Zoo, Parken Zoo, and the Governments of Montserrat and Dominica. Releases from this programme have already taken place in a hope to increase the numbers of the frog and reduce extinction risk from Chytridiomycosis.

The national bird is the endemic Montserrat oriole (Icterus oberi). The IUCN Red List classifies it as vulnerable, having previously listed it as critically endangered. Captive populations are held in several zoos in the UK including: Chester Zoo, London Zoo, Jersey Zoo and Edinburgh Zoo.

The Montserrat galliwasp (Diploglossus montisserrati), a type of lizard, is endemic to Montserrat and is listed on the IUCN Red List as critically endangered. A species action plan has been developed for this species.

In 2005, a biodiversity assessment for the Centre Hills was conducted. To support the work of local conservationists, a team of international partners, including Durrell Wildlife Conservation Trust, Royal Botanic Gardens, Kew, Royal Society for the Protection of Birds and Montana State University, carried out extensive surveys and collected biological data. Researchers from Montana State University found that the invertebrate fauna was particularly rich on the island. The report found that the number of invertebrate species known to occur in Montserrat is 1241. The number of known beetle species is 718 species from 63 families. It is estimated that 120 invertebrates are endemic to Montserrat.

Montserrat is known for its coral reefs and its caves along the shore. These caves house many species of bats, and efforts are underway to monitor and protect the ten species of bats from extinction.

The Montserrat tarantula (Cyrtopholis femoralis) is the only species of tarantula native to the island. It was first bred in captivity at the Chester Zoo in August 2016.

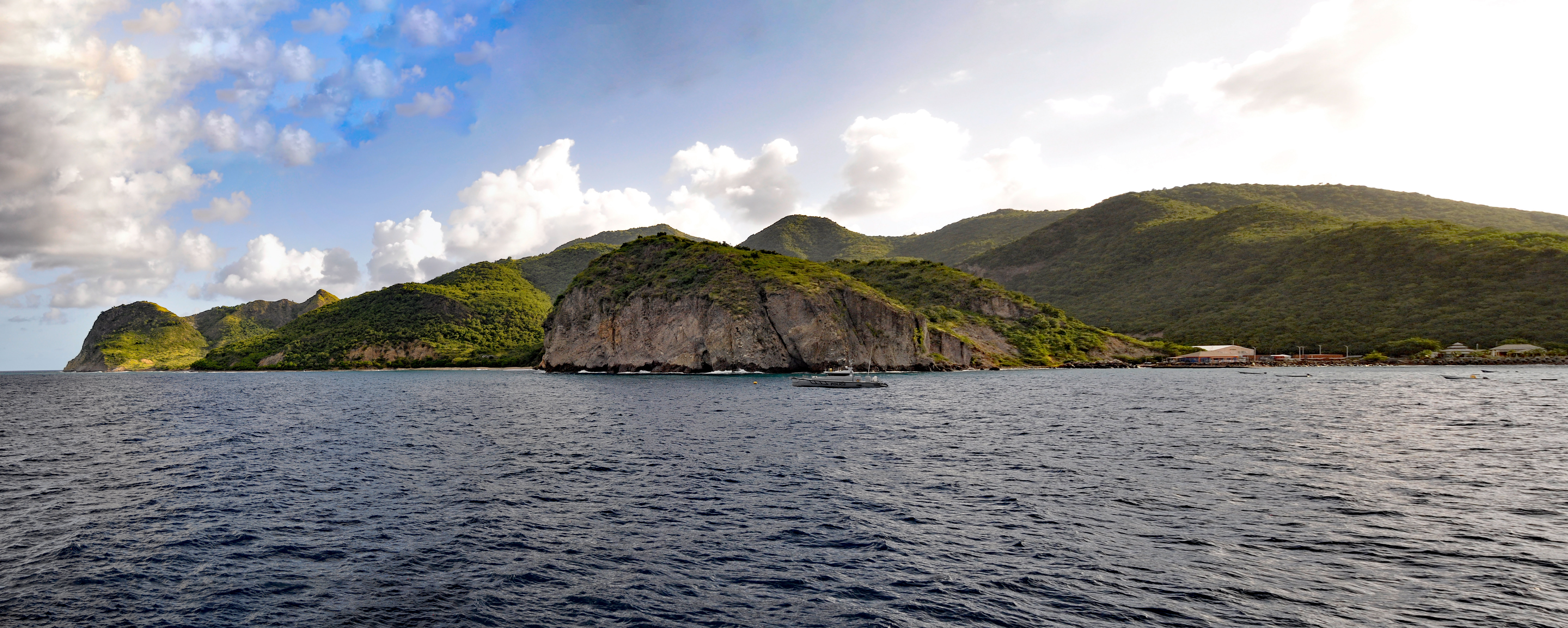
Northern coast of Montserrat

=== Climate ===
Montserrat has a tropical rainforest climate (Af according to the Köppen climate classification) with the temperature being warm and consistent year-round, and lots of precipitation. Summer and autumn are wetter because of Atlantic hurricanes.

Climate data for Plymouth
Month	Jan	Feb	Mar	Apr	May	Jun	Jul	Aug	Sep	Oct	Nov	Dec	Year
Record high °C (°F)	32 (90)	33 (91)	34 (93)	34 (93)	36 (97)	37 (99)	37 (99)	37 (99)	36 (97)	34 (93)	37 (99)	33 (91)	37 (99)
Mean daily maximum °C (°F)	29 (84)	30 (86)	31 (88)	31 (88)	32 (90)	32 (90)	33 (91)	33 (91)	32 (90)	31 (88)	30 (86)	29 (84)	31 (88)
Mean daily minimum °C (°F)	23 (73)	23 (73)	24 (75)	24 (75)	24 (75)	25 (77)	25 (77)	25 (77)	24 (75)	24 (75)	24 (75)	23 (73)	24 (75)
Record low °C (°F)	17 (63)	18 (64)	18 (64)	18 (64)	19 (66)	21 (70)	22 (72)	22 (72)	21 (70)	19 (66)	19 (66)	18 (64)	17 (63)
Average precipitation mm (inches)	122 (4.8)	86 (3.4)	112 (4.4)	89 (3.5)	97 (3.8)	112 (4.4)	155 (6.1)	183 (7.2)	168 (6.6)	196 (7.7)	180 (7.1)	140 (5.5)	1,640 (64.6)
Source: BBC Weather

== Economy ==
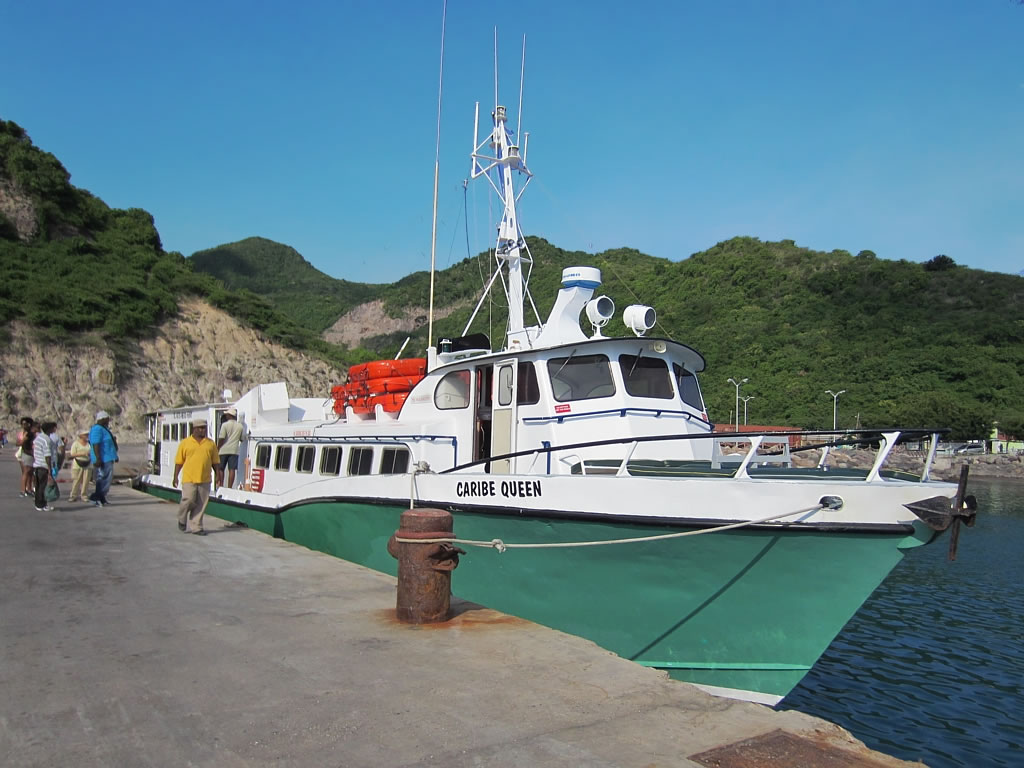
The MV Caribe Queen is a Nevis ferry boat which formerly shuttled passengers between Antigua and Montserrat several times a week

Montserrat's economy was devastated by the 1995 eruption and its aftermath; currently the island's operating budget is largely supplied by the British government and administered through the Department for International Development (DFID) amounting to approximately £24 million per year from 2012-13 until 2014-15. Additional amounts are secured through income and property taxes, licence and other fees as well as customs duties levied on imported goods.

The limited economy of Montserrat, with a population under 5000, consumes 2.5 MW of electric power, produced by five diesel generators. Two exploratory geothermal wells have found good resources and the pad for a third geothermal well was prepared in 2016. Together the geothermal wells are expected to produce more power than the island requires. A 250 kW solar PV station was commissioned in 2019, with plans for another 750 kW.

A report published by the CIA indicates that the value of exports totalled the equivalent of US$5.7 million (2017 est.), consisting primarily of electronic components, plastic bags, apparel, hot peppers, limes, live plants and cattle. The value of imports totalled US$31.02 million (2016 est.), consisting primarily of machinery and transportation equipment, foodstuffs, manufactured goods, fuels and lubricants.

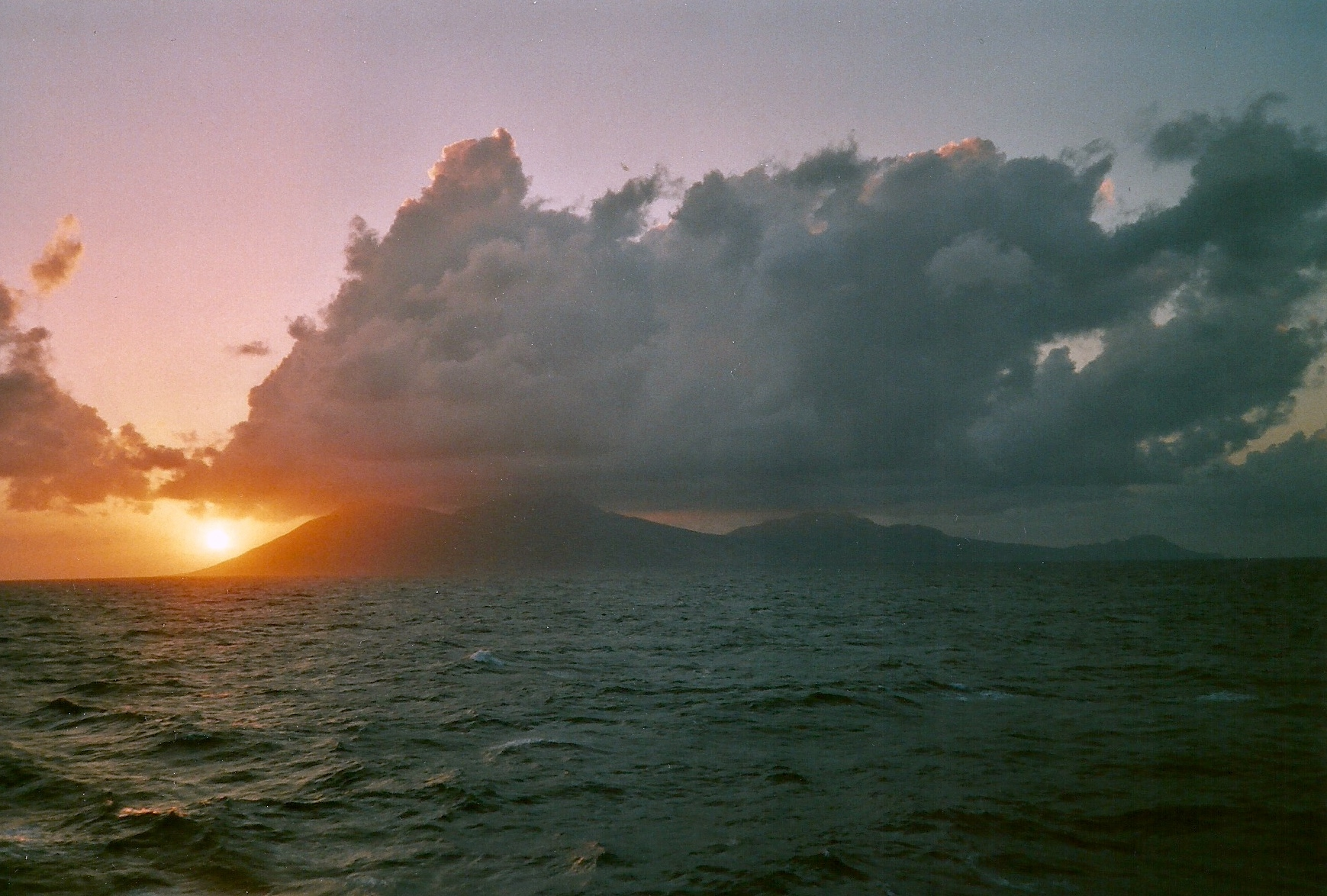
Montserrat from the Guadeloupe Passage

In 1979, the Beatles' producer George Martin opened AIR Studios Montserrat, making the island popular with musicians who often went there to record while taking advantage of the island's climate and beautiful surroundings. In the early hours of 17 September 1989, Hurricane Hugo passed the island as a Category 4 hurricane, damaging more than 90% of the structures on the island. AIR Studios Montserrat closed, and the tourist economy was virtually wiped out. The slowly recovering tourist industry was again wiped out with the eruption of the Soufrière Hills Volcano in 1995, although it began partially to recover within fifteen years.

== Transport ==
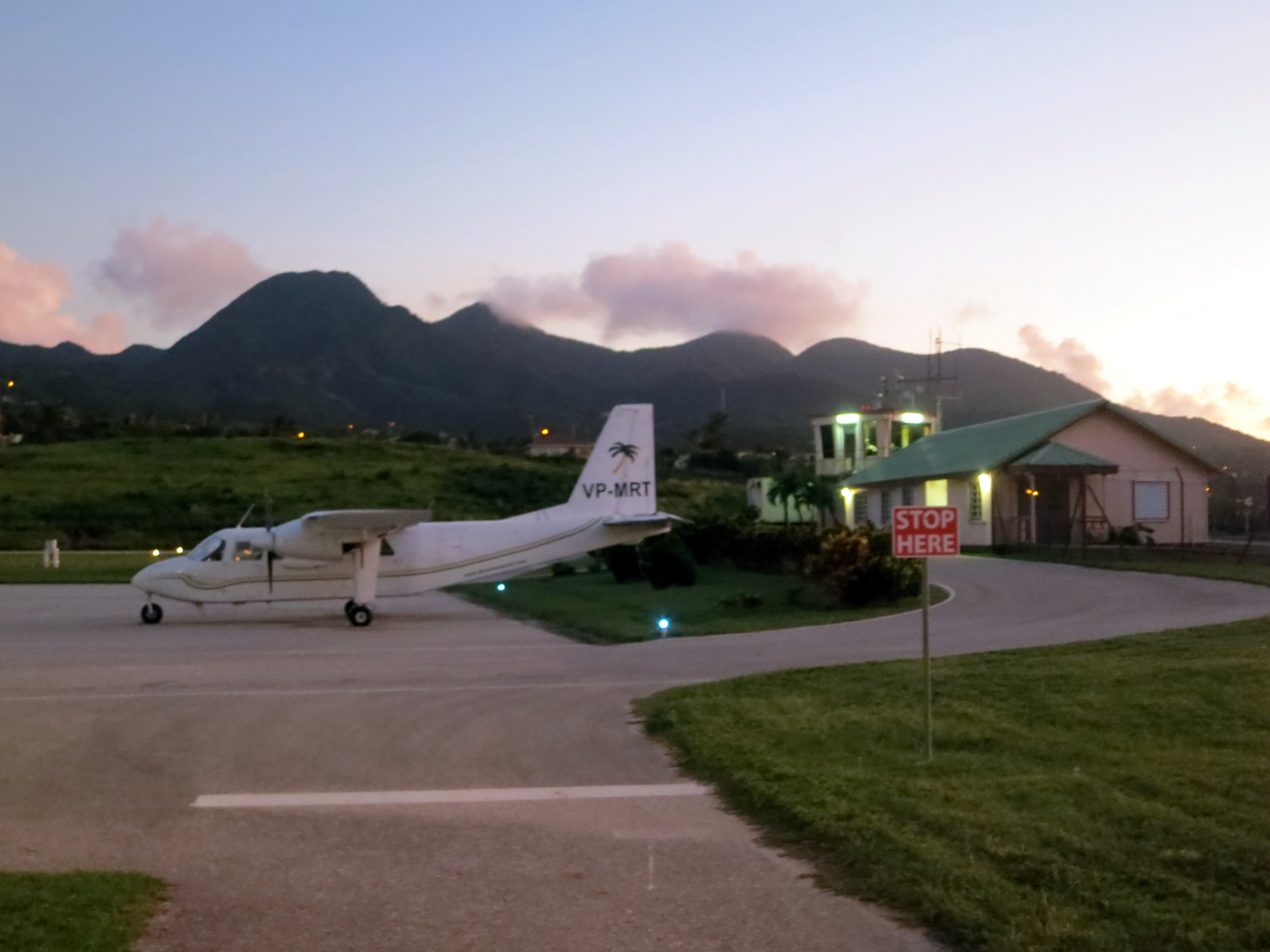
John A. Osborne Airport

=== Air ===
John A. Osborne Airport is the only airport on the island (constructed after the W. H. Bramble Airport was destroyed in 1997 by the volcanic eruption). Scheduled service to Antigua is provided by FlyMontserrat and ABM Air. Charter flights are also available to the surrounding islands.

=== Sea ===
Ferry service to the island was provided by the Jaden Sun Ferry. It ran from Heritage Quay in St. John's, Antigua and Barbuda to Little Bay on Montserrat. The ride was about an hour and a half and operated five days a week.

This service stopped in 2020 due to being financially unsustainable and the only access to Montserrat now is by air.

== Demographics ==
The 1997 eruption led to a dramatic decrease in population.

Montserrat had a population of 7,119 in 1842.

The island had a population of 5,879 (according to a 2008 estimate). An estimated 8,000 refugees left the island (primarily to the UK) following the resumption of volcanic activity in July 1995; the population was 13,000 in 1994. The 2011 Montserrat census indicated a population of 4,922. In early 2016, the estimated population had reached nearly 5,000 primarily due to immigration from other islands.

Age structure (2003 estimates):

- up to 14 years: 23.4% (male 1,062; female 1,041)
- 15 to 64 years: 65.3% (male 2,805; female 3,066)
- 65 years and over: 11.3% (male 537; female 484)

The median age of the population was 28.1 as of 2002 and the sex ratio was 0.96 males/female as of 2000.

The population growth rate is 6.9% (2008 est.), with a birth rate of 17.57 births/1,000 population, death rate of 7.34 deaths/1,000 population (2003 est.), and net migration rate of 195.35/1,000 population (2000 est.) There is an infant mortality rate of 7.77 deaths/1000 live births (2003 est.). The life expectancy at birth is 75.9 years: 76.8 for males and 75.0 for females (2023 est.). Globally, only Montserrat has a higher life expectancy for males than females, a difference of 1.8 years. The total fertility rate is 1.8 children born/woman (2003 est.).

According to the Montserrat government's 2024 population census, the island has a total population of 4,386, a 10.9% drop compared to 2011.

=== Language ===
Distribution of Montserratian Creole

English is the sole official language and the main spoken language. A few thousand people speak Montserrat Creole, a dialect of Antiguan and Barbudan Creole. Historically, Irish was spoken, but it has disappeared from use.

==== Irish language in Montserrat ====
The Irish constituted the largest proportion of the white population from the founding of the colony in 1628. Most were indentured servants; others were merchants or plantation owners. The geographer Thomas Jeffrey claimed in The West India Atlas (1780) that the majority of those on Montserrat were either Irish or of Irish descent, "so that the use of the Irish language is preserved on the island, even among the Negroes".

African slaves and Irish indentured servants of all classes were in constant contact, with sexual relationships being common and a population of mixed descent appearing as a consequence. The Irish were also prominent in Caribbean commerce, with their merchants importing Irish goods such as beef, pork, butter and herring, and also importing slaves.

There is indirect evidence that the use of the Irish language continued in Montserrat until at least the middle of the nineteenth century. The County Kilkenny diarist and Irish scholar Amhlaoibh Ó Súilleabháin noted in 1831 that he had heard that Irish was still spoken in Montserrat by both black and white inhabitants.

In 1852, Henry H. Breen wrote in Notes and Queries that "The statement that 'the Irish language is spoken in the West India Islands, and that in some of them it may be said to be almost vernacular,' is true of the little Island of Montserrat, but has no foundation with respect to the other colonies."

In 1902, The Irish Times quoted the Montreal Family Herald in a description of Montserrat, noting that "the negroes to this day speak the old Irish Gaelic tongue, or English with an Irish brogue. A story is told of a Connaught man who, on arriving at the island, was, to his astonishment, hailed in a vernacular Irish by the black people."

A letter by W. F. Butler in The Atheneum (15 July 1905) quotes an account by a Cork civil servant, C. Cremen, of what he had heard from a retired sailor called John O'Donovan, a fluent Irish speaker:

He frequently told me that in the year 1852, when mate of the brig Kaloolah, he went ashore on the island of Montserrat which was then out of the usual track of shipping. He said he was much surprised to hear the negroes actually talking Irish among themselves, and that he joined in the conversation ...

The British phonetician John C. Wells conducted research into speech in Montserrat in 1977–78 (which included also Montserratians resident in London). He found media claims that Irish speech, whether Anglo-Irish or Irish Gaelic, influenced contemporary Montserratian speech were largely exaggerated. He found little in phonology, morphology or syntax that could be attributed to Irish influence, and in Wells' report, only a small number of Irish words in use, one example being minseach [ˈmʲiɲʃəx] which he suggests is the noun goat.

=== Religion ===
In 2001, the CIA estimated the primary religion as Protestant (67.1%, including Anglican 21.8%, Methodist 17%, Pentecostal 14.1%, Seventh-day Adventist 10.5%, and Church of God 3.7%), with Catholics constituting 11.6%, Rastafarian 1.4%, other 6.5%, none 2.6%, unspecified 10.8%. By 2018, the statistics were Protestant 71.4% (includes Anglican 17.7%, Pentecostal/Full Gospel 16.1%, Seventh Day Adventist 15%, Methodist 13.9%, Church of God 6.7%, other Protestant 2%), Roman Catholic 11.4%, Rastafarian 1.4%, Hindu 1.2%, Jehovah's Witness 1%, Muslim 0.4%, unspecified 5.1%, none 7.9% (2018 est.)

Religion in Montserrat (ARDA 2020 est.)
1. Protestant (76.6%)
2. Catholic (9.29%)
3. Other Christian (5.51%)
4. Baháʼí (1.47%)
5. No religion (6.86%)
6. other (0.25%)

=== Ethnic groups ===
Residents of Montserrat are known as Montserratians. The population is predominantly, but not exclusively, of mixed African-Irish descent. It is not known with certainty how many African slaves and indentured Irish labourers were brought to the West Indies, though according to one estimate some 60,000 Irish were "Barbadosed" by Oliver Cromwell, some of whom would have arrived in Montserrat.

Data published by the Central Intelligence Agency indicates the ethnic group mix as follows (2011 est.):

- 88.4%: African/black
- 3.7%: mixed
- 3.0%: Hispanic/Spanish (of any race, including white)
- 2.7%: non-Hispanic Caucasian/white
- 1.5%: East Indian/Indian
- 0.7%: other

As of 2018 the statistics were estimated at:

- African/Black 86.2%,
- mixed 4.8%
- Hispanic/Spanish 3%
- Caucasian/White 2.7%
- East Indian/Indian 1.6%
- other 1.8%

== Education ==
Education in Montserrat is compulsory for children between the ages of 5 and 14, and free up to the age of 17. The only secondary school (pre-16 years of age) on the island is the Montserrat Secondary School (MSS) in Salem. Montserrat Community College (MCC) is a community college (post-16 and tertiary educational institution) in Salem. The University of the West Indies maintains its Montserrat Open Campus. The University of Science, Arts and Technology is a private medical school in Olveston.

== Culture ==
=== Cuisine ===
The national dish of Montserrat is goat water, a hearty stew made from goat meat, typically served with crusty bread rolls. Montserrat's cuisine reflects a blend of British and Caribbean culinary traditions, owing to its status as a British Overseas Territory in the Caribbean. The local diet features a variety of light meats, including fish, seafood, and chicken, which are commonly grilled or roasted. Montserrat's culinary heritage is a fusion of multiple cultural influences, including Spanish, French, African, Indian, and Amerindian, as demonstrated by dishes such as Montserrat jerk shrimp, flavored with rum, cinnamon bananas, and cranberry. In more rural areas, local ingredients are served in traditional homemade dishes like mahi-mahi and locally baked breads.

=== Media ===
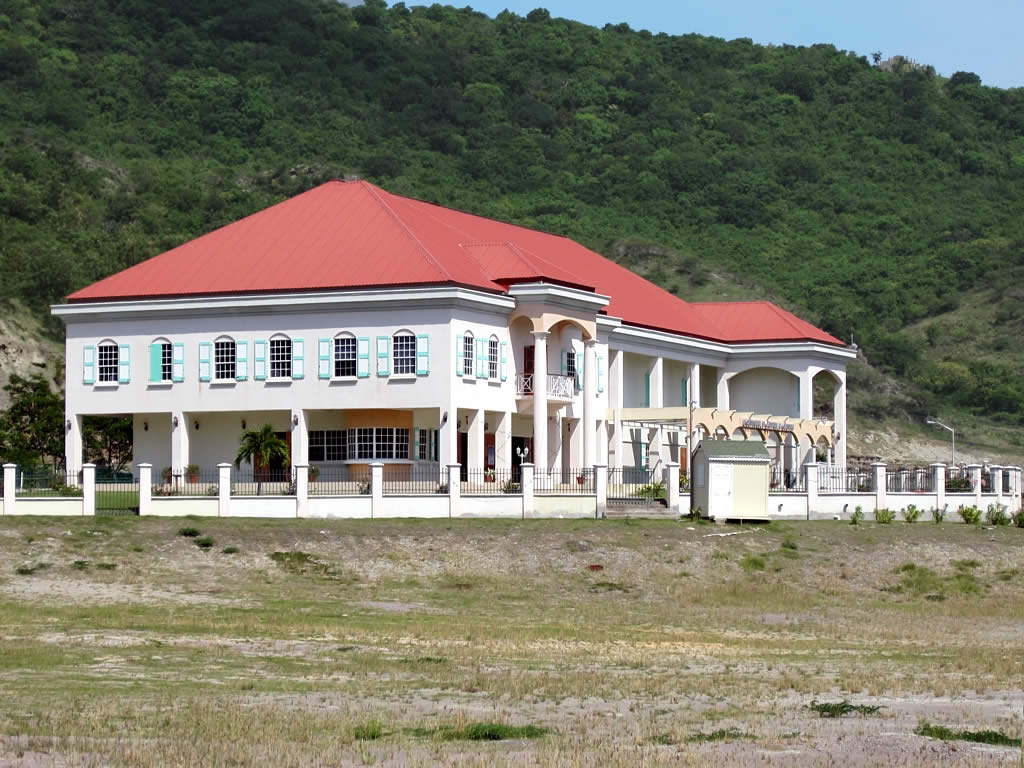
The Montserrat Cultural Centre overlooking Little Bay

Montserrat is served by a single national radio station, Radio Montserrat. The station provides a diverse range of programming, including music and news, catering to both local residents and the Montserratian diaspora via online streaming. Prominent programs include the Morning Show, hosted by Basil Chambers, and the Cultural Show, presented by Rose Willock.

Montserrat has been a filming location for notable media projects. In the 1980s, the island was used as the backdrop for music videos by the rock band The Police, specifically for their songs "Every Little Thing She Does Is Magic" and "Spirits in the Material World." Additionally, significant portions of the 2020 film Wendy were shot on the island in 2017.

In 2023, a documentary titled Ben Fogle and the Buried City, produced by Ben Fogle, explored the abandoned capital of Plymouth, which was devastated by volcanic ash. The 90-minute film premiered on Channel 5 in the United Kingdom and was also screened at the Montserrat Cultural Centre, attracting a substantial local audience.

=== AIR Montserrat studio ===
AIR Montserrat was a residential recording studio located in Salem, Montserrat, at coordinates 16°44′28″N 62°12′53″W. Established by Associated Independent Recording (AIR) and constructed near the residence of producer George Martin, the studio opened in July 1979. It featured several villas to accommodate clients during recording sessions. The studio was equipped with a 46-channel Neve mixing console, two MCI 24-track recorders, three Ampex ATR-102 2-track tape recorders, an MCI synchronizer for 46-track work, and JBL and Tannoy monitors.

The first band to record at AIR Montserrat was the Climax Blues Band, working on their album Real to Reel. Other prominent artists and bands who recorded there included Dire Straits; Paul McCartney; Elton John; Earth, Wind & Fire; Jimmy Buffett; The Police; The Rolling Stones; and Rush. Notable albums produced at the studio include:

- Dire Straits' Brothers in Arms
- Duran Duran's Seven and the Ragged Tiger
- Jimmy Buffett's Volcano (named for Soufrière Hills)
- the Police's Synchronicity and Ghost in the Machine
- Rush's Power Windows

AIR Montserrat operated for over a decade until it was severely damaged by Hurricane Hugo in 1989, leading to its closure. The island faced further challenges due to volcanic eruptions between 1995 and 1997. In response to these events, George Martin organized fundraising initiatives to support Montserrat's residents.

In September 1997, Martin hosted Music for Montserrat at London's Royal Albert Hall, featuring performances by artists such as Paul McCartney, Mark Knopfler, Elton John, Sting, Phil Collins, Eric Clapton, and Midge Ure. The event raised £1.5 million for short-term relief efforts. Additionally, Martin released 500 limited-edition lithographs of his score for the Beatles' song "Yesterday," signed by himself and Paul McCartney. The sale of these lithographs raised over US$1.4 million, which funded the construction of a cultural and community center to aid the island's recovery.

=== Sites ===
Montserrat has multiple cultural sites and landmarks open to the public:

- National Museum of Montserrat, a national museum focusing on the history of Montserrat
- Montserrat Volcano Observatory, the island's volcanic observatory
- Plymouth (ghost town), the only volcanic-buried town in the Americas
- Jack Boy Hill, a viewing facility with views of the island's volcano, towns, and beaches

== Sport ==
=== Yachting ===
Montserrat is home to the Montserrat Yachting Association.

=== Athletics ===
Montserrat has competed in every Commonwealth Games since 1994.

Miguel Francis, a sprinter who now represents the United Kingdom and previously represented Antigua and Barbuda, was born in Montserrat. He holds the Antiguan National record over 200m in 19.88.

=== Basketball ===
Basketball is growing in popularity in Montserrat with the country now setting up their own basketball league. The league contains six teams, which are the Look-Out Shooters, Davy Hill Ras Valley, Cudjoe Head Renegades, St. Peters Hilltop, Salem Jammers and MSS School Warriors. They have also built a new 800 seater complex which cost $1.5 million.

=== Cricket ===
In common with many Caribbean islands, cricket is a very popular sport in Montserrat. Players from Montserrat are eligible to play for the West Indies cricket team. Jim Allen was the first to play for the West Indies and he represented the World Series Cricket West Indians, although, with a very small population, no other player from Montserrat had gone on to represent the West Indies until Lionel Baker made his One Day International debut against Pakistan in November 2008.

The Montserrat cricket team forms a part of the Leeward Islands cricket team in regional domestic cricket; however, it plays as a separate entity in minor regional matches, as well having previously played Twenty20 cricket in the Stanford 20/20. Two grounds on the island have held first-class matches for the Leeward Islands, the first and most historic was Sturge Park in Plymouth, which had been in use since the 1920s. This was destroyed in 1997 by the volcanic eruption. A new ground, the Salem Oval, was constructed and opened in 2000. This has also held first-class cricket. A second ground has been constructed at Little Bay.

=== Football ===
Montserrat has its own FIFA affiliated football team, and has competed in the World Cup qualifiers five times from 2002 to 2018 but never advanced to the finals. They have also failed to ever qualify for the Gold Cup and Caribbean Cup. A field for the team, the Blakes Estate Stadium, was built near the airport by FIFA's Goal Programme. In 2002, the team competed in a friendly match with the second-lowest-ranked team in FIFA at that time, Bhutan, in The Other Final, the same day as the final of the 2002 World Cup. Bhutan won 4–0. The current national team relies mostly on the diaspora residing in England.

Montserrat has a club league, the Montserrat Championship, which has played sporadically since 1974. The league was most recently on hiatus from 2005 until 2015 but restarted play in 2016.

=== Surfing ===
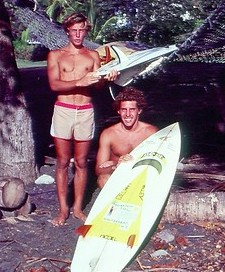
Surfer brothers Carrll and Gary Robilotta at Isle's Bay, Montserrat

Carrll Robilotta, whose parents moved from the United States to Montserrat in 1980, was responsible for pioneering the sport of surfing on the island. He and his brother Gary explored, discovered, and named the surf spots on the island during the 80s and early 90s.

Boxing

Current undefeated professional boxer Armani Francis 2-0 based in Bradford UK

== Settlements ==
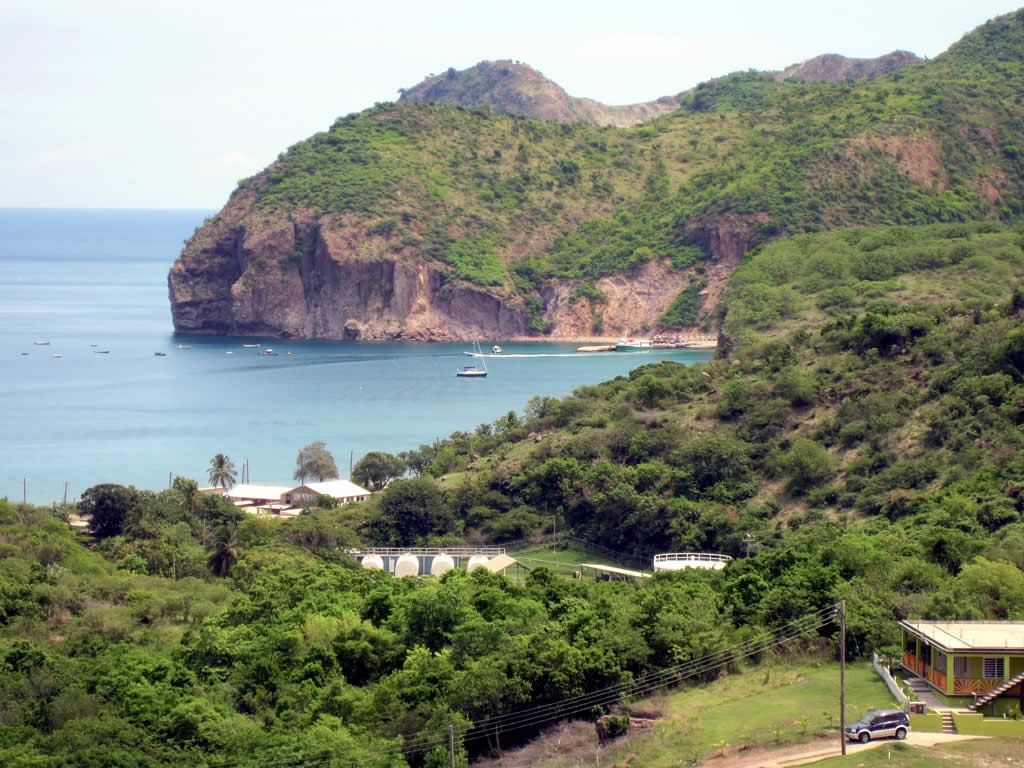
Little Bay, the site of the new capital. The project was funded by the UK's Department for International Development.

Settlements within the exclusion zone are no longer habitable. See also List of settlements abandoned after the 1997 Soufrière Hills eruption.

=== Settlements in the safe zone ===
- Baker Hill
- Banks
- Barzeys
- Blakes
- Brades
- Carr's Bay
- Cavalla Hill
- Cheap End
- Cudjoe Head
- Davy Hill
- Dick Hill
- Drummonds
- Flemmings
- Fogarty
- Frith
- Garibaldi Hill
- Gerald's (Note: Includes the new airport in the north of the island.)
- Hope
- Jack Boy Hill
- Judy Piece
- Katy Hill
- Lawyers Mountain
- Little Bay
- Lookout
- Manjack
- Mongo Hill
- New Windward Estate
- Nixons
- Old Towne
- Olveston
- Peaceful Cottage
- Salem
- Shinlands
- St. John's
- St. Peter's
- Sweeney's
- Woodlands
- Yellow Hill

=== Abandoned settlements in the exclusion zone ===
Settlements in italics have been destroyed by pyroclastic flows since the 1997 eruption. Others have been evacuated or destroyed since 1995.

- Amersham
- Beech Hill
- Bethel
- Bramble
- Bransby
- Bugby Hole
- Cork Hill
- Dagenham
- Delvins
- Dyers
- Elberton
- Farm
- Fairfield
- Fairy Walk
- Farrells
- Farells Yard
- Ffryes
- Fox's Bay
- Gages
- Gallways Estate
- Gringoes
- Gun Hill
- Happy Hill
- Harris
- Harris Lookout
- Hermitage
- Hodge's Hill
- Jubilee
- Kinsale
- Lees
- Locust Valley
- Long Ground
- Molyneux
- Morris
- Parsons
- Plymouth
- Richmond
- Richmond Hill
- Roche's Yard
- Robuscus Mt
- Shooter's Hill
- Soufrière
- Spanish Point
- St. George's Hill
- St. Patrick's
- Streatham
- Trants
- Trials
- Tuitts
- Victoria
- Webbs
- Weekes
- White's
- Windy Hill

== Notable Montserratians ==
- Jim Allen (1951 – 2025), former cricketer who represented the World Series Cricket West Indians
- Jennette Arnold, the first Montserratian elected as a Member of the London Assembly.
- Lionel Baker (born 1984), the first Montserratian to represent the West Indies in international cricket
- Alphonsus "Arrow" Cassell (1949 – 2010), musician known for his soca song "Hot Hot Hot"
- Chadd Cumberbatch, visual and performing artist, poet and playwright.
- Margaret Dyer-Howe (1941 – 2019), Montserrat's second woman to be appointed a cabinet minister.
- Ettore Ewen (born 1986), American professional wrestler and former WWE Heavyweight Champion, 11-time tag team champion, former college football player and powerlifter.
- Howard Fergus (1937 – 2023) , author, poet and three time acting governor of Montserrat
- Annie Greenaway (1905 – 1995), soprano and philanthropist
- Patricia Griffin (1907 – 1986), pioneer nurse and volunteer social worker
- George Irish (c. 1942 – 2019), writer, human rights activist
- Kadiff Kirwan (born 1989), actor
- E. A. Markham (1939 – 2008), poet and author
- Dean Mason (born 1989), association footballer
- Ellen Dolly Peters (1894 – 1995), teacher and trade unionist
- Q-Tip (born 1970), rapper, songwriter and producer; his father emigrated to Cleveland, United States from Montserrat
- Vernon Reid (born 1958), guitarist with Living Colour
- Shane Ryan (born 1969), writer, human rights activist
- Veronica Ryan (born 1956), sculptor and winner of the 2022 Turner Prize
- M. P. Shiel (1865 – 1947), writer of supernatural, horror and scientific romances.
- Lyle Taylor (born 1990), association footballer
- Rowan Taylor (born 1984), international footballer
- Maizie Williams (born 1951), member of pop group Boney M

== See also ==
- Bibliography of Montserrat
- Index of Montserrat-related articles
- Outline of Montserrat
