= List of political parties in Montserrat =

This article lists political parties in Montserrat.

== Current parties ==
Since the 2024 Montserratian general election:

Party	Abbr.	Leader	MPs
United Alliance	UA	Reuben Meade	5 / 9
Movement for Change and Prosperity	MCAP	Easton Taylor-Farrell	3 / 9
People's Democratic Movement	PDM	Paul Lewis	1 / 9

== Defunct parties ==
- Montserrat Labour Party (MLP)
- Montserrat Democratic Party (MDP)
- Movement for National Reconstruction (MNR)
- National Development Party (NDP)
- National Progressive Party (NPP)
- New People's Liberation Movement (NPLM)
- People's Progressive Alliance (PPA)
- People's Liberation Movement (PLM)
- Progressive Democratic Party (PDP)

== See also ==
- Politics of Montserrat
- List of political parties by country
