= 2019 Montserratian general election =

← 2014	18 November 2019	2024 →

9 of the 11 seats in the Legislative Assembly 5 seats needed for a majority
- Turnout: 62.52% (▼8.54pp)
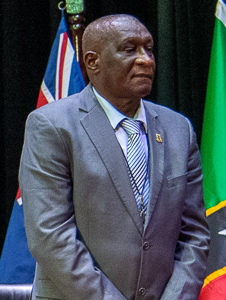

	First party	Second party
Leader	Easton Taylor-Farrell	Paul Lewis
Party	MCAP	PDM
Last election	35.36%, 2 seats	50.02%, 7 seats
Seats won	5	3
Seat change	▲3	▼4
Popular vote	8,511	5,969
Percentage	42.66%	29.92%
- Winning party by polling division
Premier before election
Donaldson Romeo
PDM
Elected Premier
Easton Taylor-Farrell
MCAP

Map of the polling districts

General elections were held in Montserrat on 18 November 2019 for the nine elected seats in the Legislative Assembly. The result was a victory for the opposition Movement for Change and Prosperity, which won five of the nine elected seats.

== Electoral system ==
The Legislative Assembly has eleven members, of which nine are elected. The other two seats are taken by the Attorney General and the Financial Secretary. The territory is a single nine-member constituency, with voters able to vote for up to nine candidates on their ballot paper under plurality-at-large voting.

== Campaign ==
A total of 35 candidates contested the elections. The Movement for Change and Prosperity was the only party to put forward a full slate of nine candidates, with the ruling People's Democratic Movement (PDM) putting forward seven. Two new parties contested the elections; the Montserrat United Labour Party had five candidates and the Montserrat National Congress three. Eleven independent candidates also ran, including incumbent Premier Donaldson Romeo, who announced he would run as an independent after he was ousted as leader of the PDM shortly after announcing the elections had been called.

== Results ==
The Movement for Change and Prosperity gained three seats, earning a majority in the Legislative Assembly. The People's Democratic Movement lost four seats and was reduced to only three MLAs. Romeo was re-elected as the sole independent MLA.

Party	Votes	%	Seats	+/–
Movement for Change and Prosperity	8,511	42.66	5	+3
People's Democratic Movement	5,969	29.92	3	–4
Montserrat United Labour Party	1,227	6.15	0	New
Montserrat National Congress	828	4.15	0	New
Independents	3,414	17.11	1	+1
Ex officio members			2	0
Total	19,949	100.00	11	0
Valid votes	2,403	99.63		
Invalid/blank votes	9	0.37		
Total votes	2,412	100.00		
Registered voters/turnout	3,858	62.52		
Source: Caribbean Elections, elections.ms

=== By candidate ===
Candidate	Party	Votes	%	Notes
Crenston Buffonge	Movement for Change and Prosperity	1,378	57.34	Elected
Paul Lewis	People's Democratic Movement	1,251	52.06	Elected
Joseph Farrell	Movement for Change and Prosperity	1,210	50.35	Elected
Donaldson Romeo	Independent	1,060	44.11	Elected
Veronica Dorsette	Movement for Change and Prosperity	1,007	41.91	Elected
Samuel Joseph	Movement for Change and Prosperity	998	41.53	Elected
Charles Kirnon	Movement for Change and Prosperity	970	40.37	Elected
David Osborne	People's Democratic Movement	947	39.41	Elected
Claude Hogan	People's Democratic Movement	873	36.33	Elected
Dwayne Hixon	People's Democratic Movement	862	35.87	
Ingrid Buffonge	Independent	861	35.83	
Jenzil Skerritt	Movement for Change and Prosperity	854	35.54	
Charlesworth Phillip	Movement for Change and Prosperity	822	34.21	
Roselyn Cassell-Sealy	Movement for Change and Prosperity	722	30.05	
Emile Duberry	People's Democratic Movement	698	29.05	
Delmaude Ryan	People's Democratic Movement	687	28.59	
David Duberry	People's Democratic Movement	651	27.09	
Norman Cassell	Movement for Change and Prosperity	550	22.89	
Peter Queeley	Montserrat United Labour Party	482	20.06	
Gregory Willock	Montserrat National Congress	405	16.85	
Lowell Lewis	Montserrat National Congress	327	13.61	
Victor James Sr.	Independent	308	12.82	
Shirley Osborne	Independent	253	10.53	
Jermaine Wade	Montserrat United Labour Party	244	10.15	
Veta Wade	Independent	233	9.70	
Franklyn Greaves	Montserrat United Labour Party	204	8.49	
Bertram Lee	Montserrat United Labour Party	204	8.49	
Alvin Gerald	Independent	196	8.16	
Eulyn Silcott-Greaves	Independent	142	5.91	
Karen Allen	Independent	120	4.99	
Dunstan Lindesay	Independent	98	4.08	
Chedmond Browne	Montserrat National Congress	96	4.00	
Keithroy Morson	Montserrat United Labour Party	93	3.87	
Glenn Francis	Independent	92	3.83	
Wilford Meade	Independent	51	2.12	
Total		19,949	100.00	
