= CARICOM heads of government =

Grouping of Caribbean national leaders

The following is a list of heads of government of the members states of CARICOM:

== Leaders ==
Nation	Head of government	Name of head of government	In office since
Antigua and Barbuda	Prime Minister	Gaston Browne	13 June 2014
Bahamas	Prime Minister	Philip Davis	16 September 2021
Barbados	Prime Minister	Mia Mottley	24 May 2018
Belize	Prime Minister	Johnny Briceño	12 November 2020
Dominica	Prime Minister	Roosevelt Skerrit	8 January 2004
Grenada	Prime Minister	Dickon Mitchell	24 June 2022
Guyana	President	Mohamed Irfaan Ali	2 August 2020
Haiti	President of Haiti	Transitional Presidential Council	25 April 2024
Jamaica	Prime Minister	Andrew Holness	3 March 2016
Montserrat	Prime Minister	Easton Taylor-Farrell	19 November 2019
Saint Kitts and Nevis	Prime Minister	Terrance Drew	6 August 2022
Saint Lucia	Prime Minister	Philip Pierre	28 July 2021
Saint Vincent and the Grenadines	Prime Minister	Godwin Friday	28 November 2025
Suriname	President	Jennifer Geerlings-Simons	16 July 2025
Trinidad and Tobago	Prime Minister	Kamla Persad-Bissessar	1 May 2025

== CARICOM Past Leaders ==
Only those persons who have been leaders since their country became a member of CARICOM are listed. The leaders are listed in order of their terms, with leaders serving twice only being listed in order of their first term:

- Antigua and Barbuda: Vere Cornwall Bird, Lester Bird and Baldwin Spencer
- Bahamas: Lynden Pindling, Hubert Ingraham (twice), Perry Christie (twice) and Hubert Minnis
- Barbados: Errol Barrow (twice), Tom Adams, Bernard St. John, Erskine Sandiford, Owen Arthur, David Thompson, and Freundel Stuart
- Belize: George Cadle Price (twice), Manuel Esquivel (twice), Said Musa and Dean Barrow
- Dominica: Edward Oliver LeBlanc, Patrick John, Oliver Seraphine, Dame Eugenia Charles, Edison James, Rosie Douglas, Pierre Charles and Osborne Riviere (acting)
- Grenada: Eric Gairy, Maurice Bishop, Herbert A. Blaize, Ben Jones, Nicholas Brathwaite, George Brizan, Keith Mitchell (twice) and Tillman Thomas
- Guyana ^{1}: Arthur Chung, Forbes Burnham, Desmond Hoyte, Cheddi Jagan, Sam Hinds, Janet Jagan, Bharrat Jagdeo (twice), Donald Ramotar , and David A. Granger
- Haiti ^{2}: Jean-Bertrand Aristide, René Préval, Michel Martelly, Jocelerme Privert (acting) and Jovenel Moïse
- Jamaica: Michael Manley (twice), Edward Seaga, P. J. Patterson, Portia Simpson-Miller (twice), Bruce Golding and Andrew Holness (twice, also incumbent)
- Montserrat: Percival Austin Bramble, John Osborne (twice), Reuben Meade (twice), Bertrand Osborne, David Brandt, Lowell Lewis and Donaldson Romeo
- Saint Kitts and Nevis: Robert L. Bradshaw, Paul Southwell, Lee Moore, Kennedy Simmonds and Denzil Douglas
- Saint Lucia: John Compton (thrice), Allan Louisy, Winston Cenac, Michael Pilgrim (interim), Vaughan Lewis, Kenny Anthony (thrice), Stephenson King, and Allen Chastanet
- Saint Vincent and the Grenadines: James Fitz-Allen Mitchell (twice), Milton Cato, Arnhim Eustace, and Ralph Gonsalves
- Suriname: Ronald Venetiaan (twice), Jules Wijdenbosch, Desi Bouterse and Chan Santokhi
- Trinidad and Tobago: Eric Williams, George Chambers, A.N.R. Robinson, Patrick Manning (twice), Basdeo Panday, Keith Rowley and Stuart Young

== Portfolios ==
Heads of Government have also established a Quasi-Cabinet arrangement to further advance specific issues/areas within the Community. The decision to establish the Quasi-Cabinet was taken at their Seventh Special Meeting (October 1999, Trinidad and Tobago), convened to deliberate on a Vision for the future of the Region. Within the Quasi-Cabinet, individual Heads of Government have responsibility for critical areas of Community Development.

The Quasi-Cabinet Portfolio allocation is set out overleaf.

As part of efforts to strengthen the Quasi-Cabinet functioning, Heads of Government undertook a review of the Portfolio allocations in July 2010, at their Thirty-First Regular Meeting held in Jamaica

These are some of the areas which have been assigned: (both officially and by national special interest.)

- Antigua and Barbuda ... Lead Head of Government for Services
- Bahamas ... Lead Head of Government for Tourism (including Land, Cruise, ACP/EU Partnership Agreement provisions etc)
- Barbados ... Lead Head of Government for the CSME (including Monetary Union)
- Belize ... Lead Head of Government for Justice and Governance
- Dominica ... Lead Head of Government for Labour (including intra-Community movement of skills)
- Grenada ... Lead Head of Government for Science and Technology (including Information and Communications)
- Guyana ... Lead Head of Government for Agriculture, Agricultural Diversification and Food Security (including the Regional Transformation Programme (RTP) and Bananas)
- Jamaica ... Lead Head of Government for External Trade Negotiations
- Saint Kitts and Nevis ... Head of Government for Human Resource Development, Health and HIV/AIDS
- Saint Lucia ... Lead Head of Government for Sustainable Development (including Environment and Disaster Management and Water)
- Saint Vincent and the Grenadines ... Lead Head of Government for Transport (Maritime and Aviation)
- Suriname ... Lead Head of Government for Community Development and Cultural Cooperation (including Culture, Gender, Youth and Sport)
- Trinidad and Tobago ... Lead Head of Government for Energy and Security

== Footnotes ==
1. Note that for Guyana only the past Presidents are listed. In most instances the past Presidents of Guyana since it joined CARICOM were also past Prime Ministers at some point. Only Arthur Chung and Cheddi Jagan have never been Prime Ministers. Prime Ministers of Guyana (since it joined CARICOM) that were never Presidents at some point were Ptolemy Reid, Hamilton Green,Moses Nagamootoo, and Mark Phillips .
2. The head of the interim government in Haiti, which was installed under controversial circumstances had been suspended, (as of 2004) from the councils of the Caribbean Community and was not recognized as the legitimate government, hence its leaders aren't listed.

== See also ==
- List of Commonwealth prime ministers
- List of current heads of state and government
- List of state leaders by date
