= 2024 Montserratian general election =

- 24 October 2024

9 of the 11 seats in the Legislative Assembly 5 seats needed for a majority
- Turnout: 67.42% (▲4.90pp)
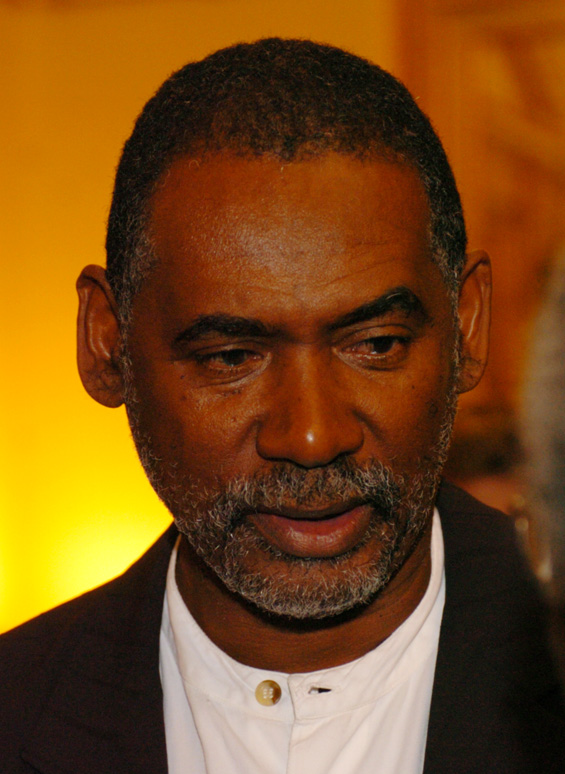

	First party	Second party	Third party
Leader	Reuben Meade	Paul Lewis	Samuel Joseph
Party	UA	PDM	MCAP
Last election	–	29.92%, 3 seats	42.66%, 5 seats
Seats won	5	3	1
Seat change	New	Steady	▼4
Popular vote	7,676	5,739	5,487
Percentage	38.72%	28.95%	27.68%
Premier before election
Easton Taylor-Farrell
MCAP
Elected Premier
Reuben Meade
UA

General elections were held in Montserrat on 24 October 2024 for the nine elected seats in the Montserrat Legislative Assembly. The election was won by the United Alliance, whom won 5 seats and their leader Reuben Meade becoming Premier for the third time.

== Electoral system ==
The Legislative Assembly has eleven members, of which nine are elected. The other two seats are taken by the attorney general and the financial secretary. The island is a single nine-member constituency, with voters able to vote for up to nine candidates on their ballot paper under plurality-at-large voting.

Candidates needed to receive at least 6% of the vote to be elected. If fewer than nine candidates received more than 6% of the vote, a second round is held within 21 days.

== Campaign ==
In total, 34 candidates stood for election. The United Alliance's George Kirnon's nomination was initially rejected by the returning officer on constitutional grounds due to him having only spent 94 days in Montserrat when the nomination criteria required 12 month residency within the territory. He appealed the decision but the Montserrat High Court rejected it. He then appealed to the Eastern Caribbean Supreme Court, who overturned the disqualification and ruled that Kirnon was eligible to stand.

== Results ==
Party	Votes	%	Seats	+/–
United Alliance	7,676	38.72	5	New
People's Democratic Movement	5,739	28.95	3	0
Movement for Change and Prosperity	5,487	27.68	1	–4
Positive Progression for People	37	0.19	0	New
Independents	887	4.47	0	–1
Ex officio members			2	0
Total	19,826	100.00	11	0
Valid votes	2,295	98.16		
Invalid/blank votes	43	1.84		
Total votes	2,338	100.00		
Registered voters/turnout	3,468	67.42		
Source: Government of Montserrat

=== By division ===
Division	UA	PDM	MCP	PPP	Ind.
Division 1 (Salem)	48.87	28.82	18.29	0.11	3.91
Division 2 (St. Peter)	39.89	31.65	24.18	0.11	4.18
Division 3 (Cudjoe Head)	31.23	33.50	30.39	0.27	4.60
Division 4 (Davy Hill)	39.82	29.71	24.89	0.26	5.32
Division 5 (St. John)	37.40	27.75	30.17	0.26	4.42
Division 6 (Look Out)	36.61	21.53	37.27	0.13	4.46
Mobile Polling Station	18.12	31.71	45.30	0.00	4.88
Montserrat	38.72	28.95	27.68	0.19	4.47
Source: Government of Montserrat

=== By candidate ===
Candidate	Party	Votes	%	Notes
Crenston Buffonge	Movement for Change and Prosperity	1,093	46.75	Elected
Ingrid Ann Buffonge	United Alliance	1,086	46.45	Elected
Reuben Meade	United Alliance	1,068	45.68	Elected
John P. Osborne	United Alliance	1,067	45.64	Elected
Veronica Dorsette	United Alliance	983	42.04	Elected
Paul Lewis	People's Democratic Movement	976	41.75	Elected
Donaldson Romeo	People's Democratic Movement	849	36.31	Elected
Dwayne Hixon	People's Democratic Movement	786	33.62	Elected
Nyota Mulcare	People's Democratic Movement	785	33.58	Elected
Jermaine Wade	People's Democratic Movement	776	33.19	
George Kirnon	United Alliance	741	31.69	
Siobhan Tuitt	Movement for Change and Prosperity]	723	30.92	
Jenzil Skerritt	United Alliance	720	30.80	
Anne Thomas	United Alliance	680	29.08	
Joseph Farrell	Movement for Change and Prosperity	676	28.91	Unseated
Glenville Daley	People's Democratic Movement	620	26.52	
David Osborne	People's Democratic Movement	608	26.01	Unseated
Samuel Joseph	Movement for Change and Prosperity	596	25.49	Unseated
Gilmore Williams	Movement for Change and Prosperity	580	24.81	
Marjorie Smith	United Alliance	545	23.31	
Marval White	Movement for Change and Prosperity	531	22.71	
Jamiel Greenaway	Movement for Change and Prosperity	499	21.34	
Edris Wade	Movement for Change and Prosperity	458	19.59	
Shirley Osborne	People's Democratic Movement	418	17.88	
Alaric Lynch	People's Democratic Movement	407	17.41	
Edith Fenton	Movement for Change and Prosperity	331	14.16	
Eustace Osborne	People's Democratic Movement	300	12.83	
Debra Lewis	Independent	297	12.70	
Delmaude Ryan	Independent	213	9.11	
Claude Gerald	Independent	137	5.86	
Charlesworth Piper	Independent	107	4.58	
Vickie Stephenson	Independent	79	3.38	
Wilford Meade	Independent	54	2.31	
Karen Allen	Positive Progression for People	37	1.58	
Total		19,826	100.00	
Source: Government of Montserrat

== Aftermath ==
Due to the results of the election, the United Alliance's Reuben Meade became the Premier of Montserrat for the third time. He was sworn in by the Governor of Montserrat, Sarah Tucker. The outgoing Premier Easton Taylor-Farrell and Samuel Joseph, the leader of the Movement for Change and Prosperity, both lost their seats.
