= 2014 Montserratian general election =

- 11 September 2014

9 of the 11 seats in the Legislative Assembly 5 seats needed for a majority
- Turnout: 71.06% (▲4.31pp)
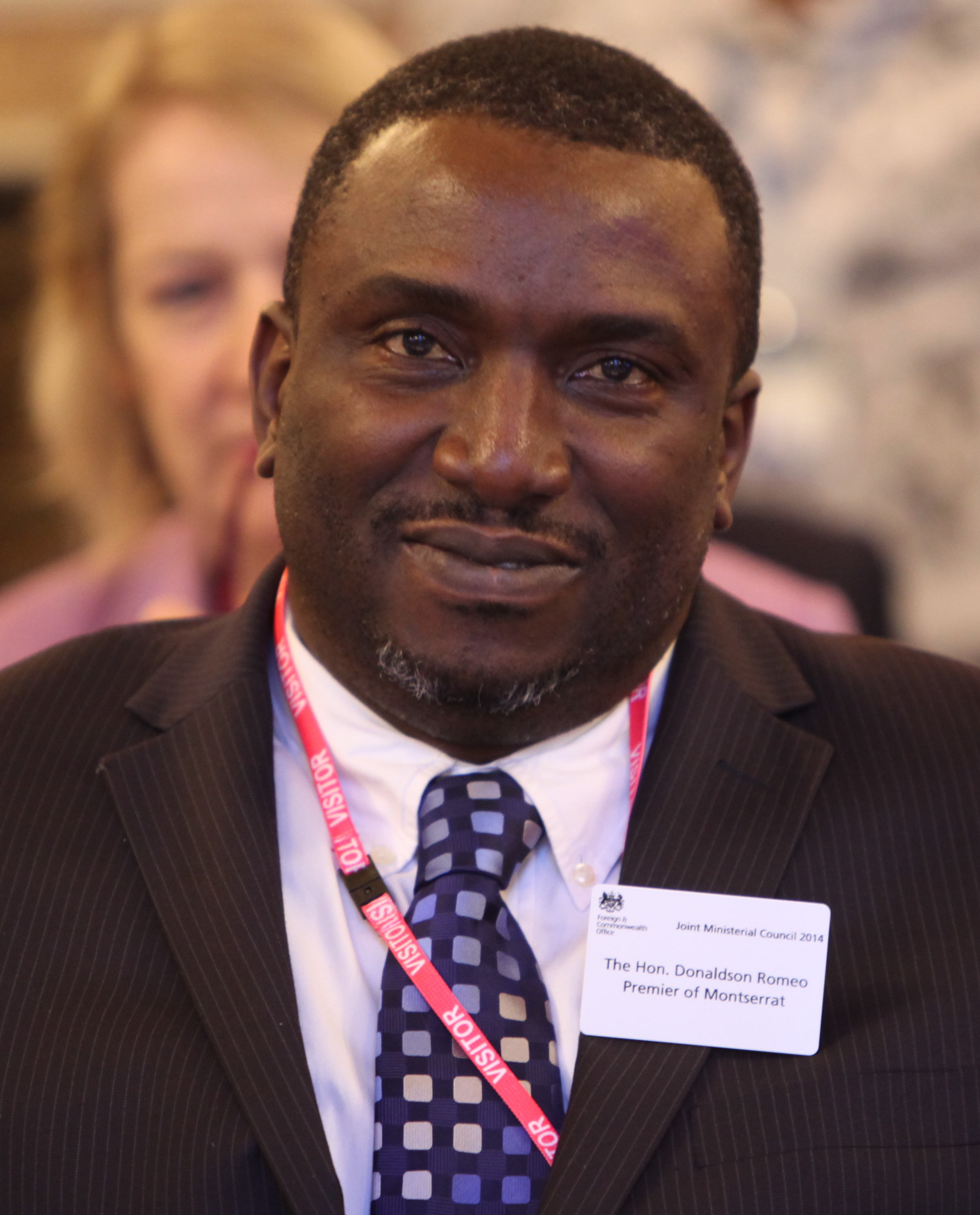

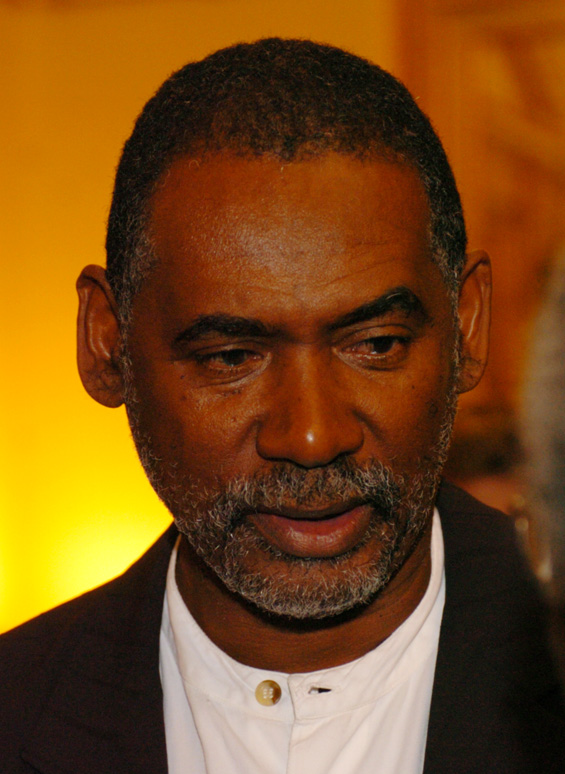
	First party	Second party
Leader	Donaldson Romeo	Reuben Meade
Party	PDM	MCAP
Last election	–	52.64%, 6 seats
Seats won	7	2
Seat change	New	▼4
Popular vote	11,702	8,319
Percentage	49.90%	35.47%
Swing	New	▼17.17pp
- Most voted-for party by polling division
Premier before election
Reuben Meade
MCAP
Elected Premier
Donaldson Romeo
PDM

General elections were held in Montserrat on 11 September 2014. The result was a victory for the newly established People's Democratic Movement, which won seven of the nine elected seats in the Legislative Assembly.

== Electoral system ==
At the time of the election, the Legislative Assembly had eleven members, of which nine were elected. The other two seats were taken by the Attorney General and the Financial Secretary. The territory was a single nine-member constituency, with voters able to vote for nine candidates on their ballot paper.

== Campaign ==
A new party, the People's Democratic Movement (PDM), was established by leader of the opposition Donaldson Romeo on 30 April 2014, in order to contest the elections. A total 31 candidates contested the elections; the ruling Movement for Change and Prosperity and the PDM both put forward a full slate of nine candidates, the Alliance of Independent Candidates had three independent candidates, with ten other independents also running.

== Results ==
Party	Votes	%	Seats	+/–
People's Democratic Movement	11,702	49.90	7	New
Movement for Change and Prosperity	8,319	35.47	2	–4
Alliance of Independent Candidates	974	4.15	0	New
Independents	2,456	10.47	0	–3
Total	23,451	100.00	9	0
Total votes	2,747	–		
Registered voters/turnout	3,866	71.06		
Source: Government of Montserrat

=== By candidate ===
Candidate	Party	Votes	%	Notes
Donaldson Romeo	People's Democratic Movement	1,695	61.70	Elected
Ingrid Buffonge	People's Democratic Movement	1,615	58.79	Elected
Paul Lewis	People's Democratic Movement	1,507	54.86	Elected
David Osborne	People's Democratic Movement	1,378	50.16	Elected
Joseph Farrell	Movement for Change and Prosperity	1,331	48.45	Elected
Delmaude Ryan	People's Democratic Movement	1,205	43.87	Elected
Reuben Meade	Movement for Change and Prosperity	1,156	42.08	Elected
Claude Hogan	People's Democratic Movement	1,128	41.06	Elected
Gregory Willock	People's Democratic Movement	1,117	40.66	Elected
Charles Kirnon	Movement for Change and Prosperity	1,085	39.50	
David Duberry	People's Democratic Movement	1,062	38.66	
Emile Duberry	People's Democratic Movement	995	36.22	
Jermaine Wade	Movement for Change and Prosperity	893	32.51	
Colin Riley	Movement for Change and Prosperity	878	31.96	
Samuel Joseph	Movement for Change and Prosperity	874	31.82	
Leroy Greaves	Movement for Change and Prosperity	814	29.63	
Brenda Daley	Movement for Change and Prosperity	754	27.45	
Victor James	Independent	662	24.10	
Crenston Buffonge	Independent	540	19.66	
Geraldine Cabey	Independent	537	19.55	
Justin Cassell	Movement for Change and Prosperity	534	19.44	
Lowell Lewis	Alliance of Independent Candidates	472	17.18	
Joel Osborne	Independent	325	11.83	
Claude Gerald	Alliance of Independent Candidates	278	10.12	
David Tuitt	Alliance of Independent Candidates	224	8.15	
Hylroy Bramble	Independent	108	3.93	
Norman Cassell	Independent	82	2.99	
Alaric Lynch	Independent	77	2.80	
Wilford Meade	Independent	68	2.48	
Catherine Tuitt	Independent	32	1.16	
Winston Pond	Independent	25	0.91	
Total		23,451	100.00	
