= Politics of Montserrat =

Politics of Montserrat takes place in a framework of a parliamentary representative democratic dependency, whereby the Premier is the head of government, and of a multi-party system. Montserrat is an internally self-governing overseas territory of the United Kingdom. The United Nations Committee on Decolonization includes Montserrat on the United Nations list of non-self-governing territories. Executive power is exercised by the government. Legislative power is vested in both the government and the Legislative Assembly. The Judiciary is independent of the executive and the legislature. Military defence is the responsibility of the United Kingdom.

== Executive branch ==
Main office-holders
Office	Name	Party	Since
King	Charles III		8 September 2022
Governor	Harriet Cross		23 April 2025
Premier	Reuben Meade	UA	25 October 2024

The Governor is appointed by the Monarch. The Premier is appointed by the Governor from among the members of the Legislative Assembly.

His cabinet is appointed by the Governor from among the elected members of the Legislative Assembly and consists also of the Attorney General, and the Finance Secretary.

The current Premier of the island is Reuben Meade, of the United Alliance, replacing the outgoing Premier, Easton Taylor-Farrell, of the Movement for Change and Prosperity.

== Legislative branch ==
Montserrat elects on territorial level a legislature. The Legislative Assembly has nine members, elected for five-year terms in one constituency.

== Political parties and elections ==
Political parties do not adhere to a single defined ideology and are difficult to distinguish from each other. Instead, policy emphasis shifts depending on the popular approval of the party leader and their policies.

=== Most recent election ===
Party	Votes	%	Seats	+/–
United Alliance	7,676	38.72	5	New
People's Democratic Movement	5,739	28.95	3	0
Movement for Change and Prosperity	5,487	27.68	1	–4
Positive Progression for People	37	0.19	0	New
Independents	887	4.47	0	–1
Ex officio members			2	0
Total	19,826	100.00	11	0
Valid votes	2,295	98.16		
Invalid/blank votes	43	1.84		
Total votes	2,338	100.00		
Registered voters/turnout	3,468	67.42		
Source: Government of Montserrat

== Judicial branch ==
The Eastern Caribbean Supreme Court, consists of the High Court of Justice and the Court of Appeal.

== Administrative divisions ==
Montserrat is divided in 3 parishes; Saint Anthony, Saint Georges, and Saint Peter.

== International organization participation ==
CARICOM, Caribbean Development Bank, ECLAC (associate), ICFTU, Interpol (subbureau), Organization of Eastern Caribbean States, WCL
