= Veronica Dorsette =

Montserratian politician

Veronica Dorsette-Hector

Member of the Legislative Assembly of Montserrat
- Incumbent
- Assumed office 2019

Personal details
- Party: United Alliance (previously Movement for Change and Prosperity)

Veronica Dorsette-Hector is a politician from Montserrat who has served as a member of the Legislative Assembly of Montserrat since 2019. She was the parliamentary secretary. She switched political parties in 2023, from Movement for Change and Prosperity to United Alliance. The same day, she resigned from being the parliamentary secretary.

== Legal career ==
Dorsette was appointed as the Chief Magistrate of Montserrat for a fixed term by the Governor of Montserrat. In 2014, the Governor was willing to offer a 2 month extension but asked Dorsette for a response to comments about her suitability made by private barristers' chambers. She did not respond so the Governor allowed the appointment to expire. Dorsette sued the Governor and the Attorney General of Montserrat on the grounds that she had not been given a chance to respond. The Eastern Caribbean Supreme Court ruled against her in 2015 on the grounds that her contract had already expired.

== Electoral history ==
Dorsette was the only woman elected in the 2019 Montserratian general election. She was reelected in the 2024 Montserratian general election.

After the 2024 election, the new Premier of Montserrat, Reuben Meade, appointed Dorsette as the deputy Premier in his Cabinet. She also became the Minister for of Infrastructure, Labour, Transport, Energy and Ecclesiastical Affairs. In 2024, she oversaw legislation that would make 9 July a public holiday in Montserrat as the National Day of Prayer and Thanksgiving. Dorsette has had a number of terms as Acting Premier when Meade has been out of Montserrat.
