= Ingrid Buffonge =

Montserratian politician

Ingrid Ann Buffonge

Member of the Legislative Assembly of Montserrat
- Incumbent
- Assumed office 2024
- In office 2014–2019

Personal details
- Party: United Alliance (previously People's Democratic Movement)

Ingrid Ann Buffonge is a politician from Montserrat who has served as a member of the Legislative Assembly of Montserrat in two non-consecutive terms. She is regarded as one of Montserrat's top physicians. She works at Glendon Hospital in St. Johns.

== Electoral history ==
Dorsette ran in the 2014 Montserratian general election as a member of the People's Democratic Movement, and was elected. She ran and lost in the 2019 Montserratian general election as an independent. She was elected in the 2024 Montserratian general election as a member of the United Alliance.
