= Dwayne Hixon =

Montserratian politician

Member of the Legislative Assembly of Montserrat
- Incumbent
- Assumed office 2024

Personal details
- Party: United Alliance (previously People's Democratic Movement)

Dwayne Hixon is a politician from Montserrat who has served as a member of the Legislative Assembly of Montserrat since 2024. Outside of politics, he is a real estate agent. He will soon become the Parliamentary Secretary in the Ministry of Agriculture, Lands, Housing, Environment and Sports.

== Electoral history ==
Hixon ran in the 2019 Montserratian general election as a member of the People's Democratic Movement, but lost. He was first elected in the 2024 Montserratian general election, after switching his party affiliation to United Alliance.
