= 2009 Montserratian general election =

General elections were held in Montserrat on 8 September 2009, two years earlier than constitutionally necessary. The Movement for Change and Prosperity (MCAP) gained a parliamentary majority with six of the nine seats, while the outgoing Chief Minister, Lowell Lewis (formerly of the Montserrat Democratic Party but campaigning as an independent), and two other independents won the other seats. Reuben Meade of the MCAP was sworn in as Chief Minister on 10 September 2009.

== Campaign ==
A total of 24 candidates contested the elections; the MCAP was the only party to run a full slate of nine candidates, whilst the Montserrat Labour Party nominated three candidates, the Montserrat Reformation Party two and the Funny Ways Party one. The remaining nine candidates were independents.

== Results ==
| Party | Votes | % | Seats | +/– |
|---|---|---|---|---|
| Movement for Change and Prosperity | 10,139 | 52.64 | 6 | +2 |
| Montserrat Labour Party | 2,011 | 10.44 | 0 | New |
| Montserrat Reformation Party | 954 | 4.95 | 0 | New |
| Funny Ways Party | 140 | 0.73 | 0 | New |
| Independents | 6,017 | 31.24 | 3 | +2 |
| Total | 19,261 | 100.00 | 9 | 0 |
| Valid votes | 2,315 | 98.64 | | |
| Invalid/blank votes | 32 | 1.36 | | |
| Total votes | 2,347 | 100.00 | | |
| Registered voters/turnout | 3,516 | 66.75 | | |
Source: Government of Montserrat, IDEA

=== By candidate ===
| Candidate | Party | Votes | % | Notes |
|---|---|---|---|---|
| Joseph Farrell | Movement for Change and Prosperity | 1,472 | 63.59 | Elected |
| Charles Kirnon | Movement for Change and Prosperity | 1,363 | 58.88 | Elected |
| David Osborne | Movement for Change and Prosperity | 1,148 | 49.59 | Elected |
| Colin Riley | Movement for Change and Prosperity | 1,140 | 49.24 | Elected |
| Reuben Meade | Movement for Change and Prosperity | 1,139 | 49.20 | Elected |
| Donaldson Romeo | Independent | 1,059 | 45.75 | Elected |
| Jermaine Wade | Movement for Change and Prosperity | 1,043 | 45.05 | Elected |
| Lowell Lewis | Independent | 1,000 | 43.20 | Elected |
| Victor James | Independent | 999 | 43.15 | Elected |
| Leroy Greaves | Movement for Change and Prosperity | 990 | 42.76 | |
| Roselyn Cassell-Sealy | Movement for Change and Prosperity | 987 | 42.63 | |
| Herman Francis | Movement for Change and Prosperity | 857 | 37.02 | |
| David Tuitt | Independent | 808 | 34.90 | |
| Idabelle Griffith-Meade | Montserrat Labour Party | 791 | 34.17 | |
| Alric J. Taylor | Montserrat Reformation Party | 706 | 30.50 | |
| Margaret Dyer-Howe | Montserrat Labour Party | 650 | 28.08 | |
| Warren Cassell | Independent | 631 | 27.26 | |
| Chedmond Browne | Montserrat Labour Party | 570 | 24.62 | |
| John Ponteen | Independent | 559 | 24.15 | |
| Alaric Lynch | Independent | 446 | 19.27 | |
| Christopher Lee | Independent | 310 | 13.39 | |
| Adelina Tuitt | Montserrat Reformation Party | 248 | 10.71 | |
| Bennette Roach | Independent | 205 | 8.86 | |
| Sylvia White-Gabriel | Funny Ways Party | 140 | 6.05 | |
| Total | | 19,261 | 100.00 | |
