= Nyota Mulcare =

Montserratian politician

Member of the Legislative Assembly of Montserrat
- Incumbent
- Assumed office 8 November 2024

Personal details
- Party: People's Democratic Movement

Nyota Mulcare is a politician from Montserrat who has served as a member of the Legislative Assembly of Montserrat since 2024. She is a member of the opposition, being a member of the minority party People's Democratic Movement.

== Electoral history ==
Her first election was the 2024 Montserratian general election, where she was elected.
