= Samuel Joseph =

Samuel Joseph may refer to:

- Samuel Joseph (Australian politician) (1824–1898), New South Wales colonial politician
- Samuel Joseph (Montserrat politician), politician
- Samuel Joseph (American football) (born 1983)
- Samuel Joseph (sculptor) (1791–1850)
- Sir Samuel Joseph, 1st Baronet (1888–1944)
