= Donaldson Romeo =

The Honourable Donaldson Romeo MLA
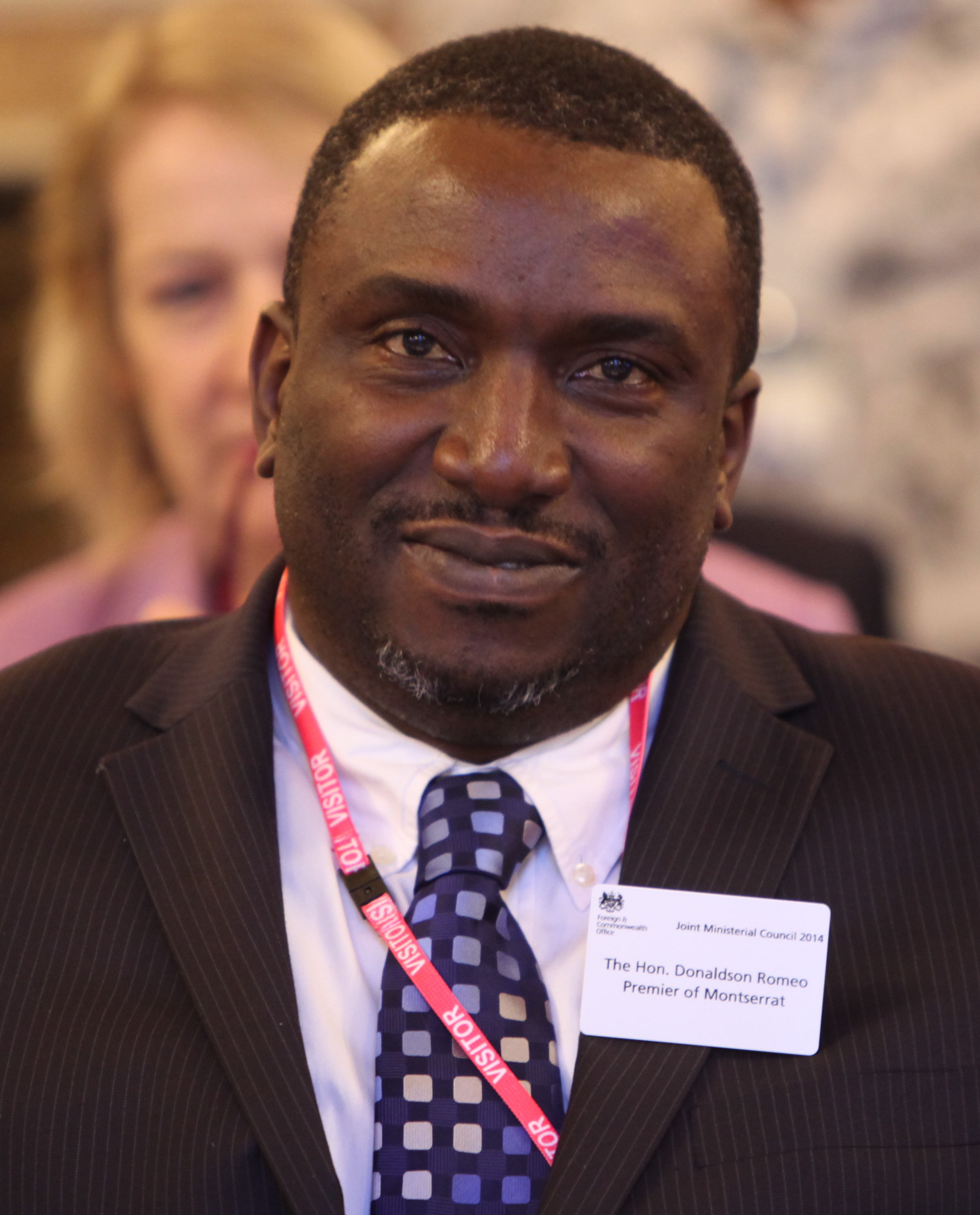
- Romeo at the Overseas Territories Joint Ministerial Council meeting in London, 3 December 2014.

Premier of Montserrat
- In office 12 September 2014 – 19 November 2019
- Monarch: Elizabeth II
- Governor: Adrian Davis; Elizabeth Carriere; Andrew Pearce
- Preceded by: Reuben Meade
- Succeeded by: Easton Taylor-Farrell

Leader of the Opposition
- In office 2011–2014

Personal details
- Born: 1962 (age 63–64) Salem, Montserrat
- Party: People's Democratic Movement
- Other political affiliations: Montserrat Democratic Party

Donaldson Romeo (born 1962) is a Montserratian politician. He is currently a member of the Legislative Assembly and served as the island's Premier from September 2014 until November 2019.

Having formerly worked as an artist and a journalist, he was first elected to parliament as an independent candidate in 2011.

== Biography ==
Romeo was born in Salem, Montserrat in 1962. He attended Salem Primary School and Montserrat Secondary School, before becoming a pupil at the George School, a boarding school in the United States. Although he started studying medicine at Temple University, he returned to Montserrat after a year to help his father with his hardware business. In 1984 he moved to the United Kingdom, where he became an artist. He was served with a deportation order, but after gaining support from MPs Ken Livingstone and John Carlisle and the National Portrait Gallery, his order was overturned.

After the court case, Romeo returned to Montserrat and continued working as an artist before rejoining his family's hardware firm. Following the eruption of Soufrière Hills in the mid-1990s, he became a journalist.

=== Political career ===
Romeo was a candidate for the Montserrat Democratic Party in the 2006 general elections. He ran in the 2009 elections as an independent, and was elected.

In 2011, Romeo became Leader of the Opposition and served in that role until September 2014.

On 30 April 2014, Romeo established the People's Democratic Movement (PDM) in order to contest the upcoming elections. The September 2014 elections saw the PDM win seven of the nine seats in the Legislative Assembly, becoming the ruling party. In October 2019, he was voted out as the leader of the PDM party and was replaced by the island's Minister of Communication and Works Paul Lewis. Romeo subsequently left the party and contested the 2019 Montserratian general election as an independent candidate.

In November 2019 Romeo was re-elected and thus continues to have a seat in the island's Legislative Assembly.
