= 2006 United Nations Security Council election =

Election to the United Nations Security Council

- 16 October – 7 November 2006

5 of 10 non-permanent seats on the United Nations Security Council
- United Nations Security Council membership after the election Permanent members Non-permanent members
- Outgoing members Tanzania (Africa) Japan (Asia) Argentina (GRULAC) Denmark (WEOG) Greece (WEOG) Elected members South Africa (Africa) Indonesia (Asia) Panama (GRULAC) Belgium (WEOG) Italy (WEOG)

The 2006 United Nations Security Council election began on 16 October 2006 during the 61st session of the United Nations General Assembly, held at United Nations Headquarters in New York City. The elections were for five non-permanent seats on the Security Council for two-year mandates commencing on 1 January 2007.

In accordance with the Security Council's rotation rules, whereby the ten non-permanent Security Council seats rotate among the various regional blocs into which UN member states traditionally divide themselves for voting and representation purposes, the five available seats were allocated as follows:

- One for Africa (held by Tanzania)
- One for Latin America and the Caribbean (held by Argentina)
- One for Asia (held by Japan)
- Two for the Western European and Others Group (held by Denmark and Greece)

While the first three votes were uncontroversial and even the one contested seat was settled in the first round, the race for the Latin American and Caribbean seat went on for an almost unprecedented 48 rounds of voting over the space of three weeks. In five days of ballots, the General Assembly was unable to decide between Guatemala and Venezuela, and the matter was only resolved when they both agreed to withdraw their candidacies and nominate Panama instead.

The final result of the election was that Belgium, Indonesia, Italy, Panama and South Africa were elected to serve on the Security Council for the 2007–08 period with South Africa being elected for the first time.

== Voting mechanics ==
To win a seat, a candidate member must receive the favourable vote of two-thirds of the member states present and voting. Votes are taken by secret ballot, with each of the UN's 192 then member states allocated one vote, and a formal ballot is conducted even in those cases in which — generally due to pre-meeting negotiations among the members of the corresponding bloc — there is only one candidacy.

If a bloc proposes more than one candidate but, after several rounds of voting, the General Assembly is unable to decide between them, the vote is opened to all the bloc's other member states. Balloting then continues in groups of three successive "restricted" and "unrestricted" rounds of voting until a winner emerges.

== African seat ==
South Africa, the only nation to contend for the African seat, was elected with 186 votes. The 2007–08 period is the first time that South Africa sits on the Security Council, occupying the seat then held by Tanzania.

== Asian seat ==
There were two contenders for the Asian seat: Indonesia received 158 votes to Nepal's 28. Indonesia replaced Japan on 1 January 2007.

== Western European and Others seats ==
The Western European and Others Group (WEOG), a bloc made up of 23 European nations as well as Turkey, Israel, Canada, the United States, Australia, and New Zealand, had two Council vacancies to fill in this election. It fielded two candidates — Belgium and Italy — both of which were voted onto the Council, with 180 and 186 supporting votes, respectively out of a total 192 valid ballots. They replaced Denmark and Greece at the end of 2006.

== Latin American and Caribbean seat ==
The Latin American and Caribbean Group (GRULAC) nominated two candidates — Guatemala and Venezuela — for its one available seat, then held by Argentina. After 47 rounds of deadlocked voting, both candidates withdrew their bids and supported the nomination of Panama as a compromise.

=== Guatemala ===
Guatemala announced its candidacy in 2002. It had the staunch support of the United States, as well as that of Mexico, the rest of Central America, Colombia, and the remaining members of WEOG. The Central American nation has never sat on the Security Council, and is one of only six of the original signatories of the UN Charter to be in that position (along with the Dominican Republic, El Salvador, Haiti, Luxembourg, and Saudi Arabia). In recent years, following the conclusion of its 36-year-long Civil War and the succession of several democratically elected governments, it has been playing a more proactive role in multilateral affairs. For instance, after having been on the receiving end of UN assistance between 1994 and 2004 with the MINUGUA verification mission, it is now a provider of troops for peacekeeping missions (215 worldwide most in MONUC), with Guatemalan soldiers deployed in Haiti, DR Congo, Côte d'Ivoire, and other global hot spots.

=== Venezuela ===
Venezuela, under President Hugo Chávez, announced its plans to seek a UNSC seat in 2004. It presented itself as an alternative to what it considered U.S. global hegemony and, in the words of foreign minister Nicolás Maduro, an "end to the unipolar world that has been so damaging". Venezuela conducted an extensive global campaign in search of support for its candidacy in the months prior to the vote, particularly in Africa, Asia, and the Middle East, where it offered generous packages of oil-funded aid; it claimed to have had the backing of Mercosur and of significant portions of the Arab League, the African Union, the Caribbean Community, the Non-Aligned Movement, Russia and China. Venezuela has occupied a seat on the UNSC on four previous occasions: 1962–63, 1977–78, 1986–87 and 1992–93.

=== Caribbean support ===
The Caribbean bloc of countries, also known as CARICOM, accounts for 14 votes in the GRULAC. Most of these states declared their backing for Venezuela at a meeting of the Caribbean Community Heads of Government meeting held earlier in 2006.

The still unresolved border dispute between Guatemala and CARICOM-member Belize, as well as a legal challenge brought by Guatemala before the World Trade Organization (WTO) over the Caribbean nations' trade deal with the European Union at the WTO, were reported as having soured the majority of Caribbean states against any backing of a Guatemalan candidacy. Belizean Prime Minister Said Musa brought up the UNSC contest during the heads of government meeting and urged the other heads to support anyone but Guatemala. Prior to its recognition of Belize's sovereignty in 1991, Guatemala claimed its neighbour's territory in its entirety, and ownership of some tracts of land along the countries' jungle border is still disputed. Fear that Guatemala would use its UNSC seat to unfair advantage in this dispute made Venezuela a more attractive choice for the Caribbean states.

Venezuela also has a territorial dispute with CARICOM member-state Guyana but, in order to secure CARICOM's backing, Venezuelan President Hugo Chávez stated publicly that his country would not use their role on the Security Council to further their territorial claims. A further element in counteracting U.S. lobbying of the CARICOM states on behalf of Guatemala was Chávez's extensive petrodollar-funded programme of development aid in the Caribbean.

=== Voting ===
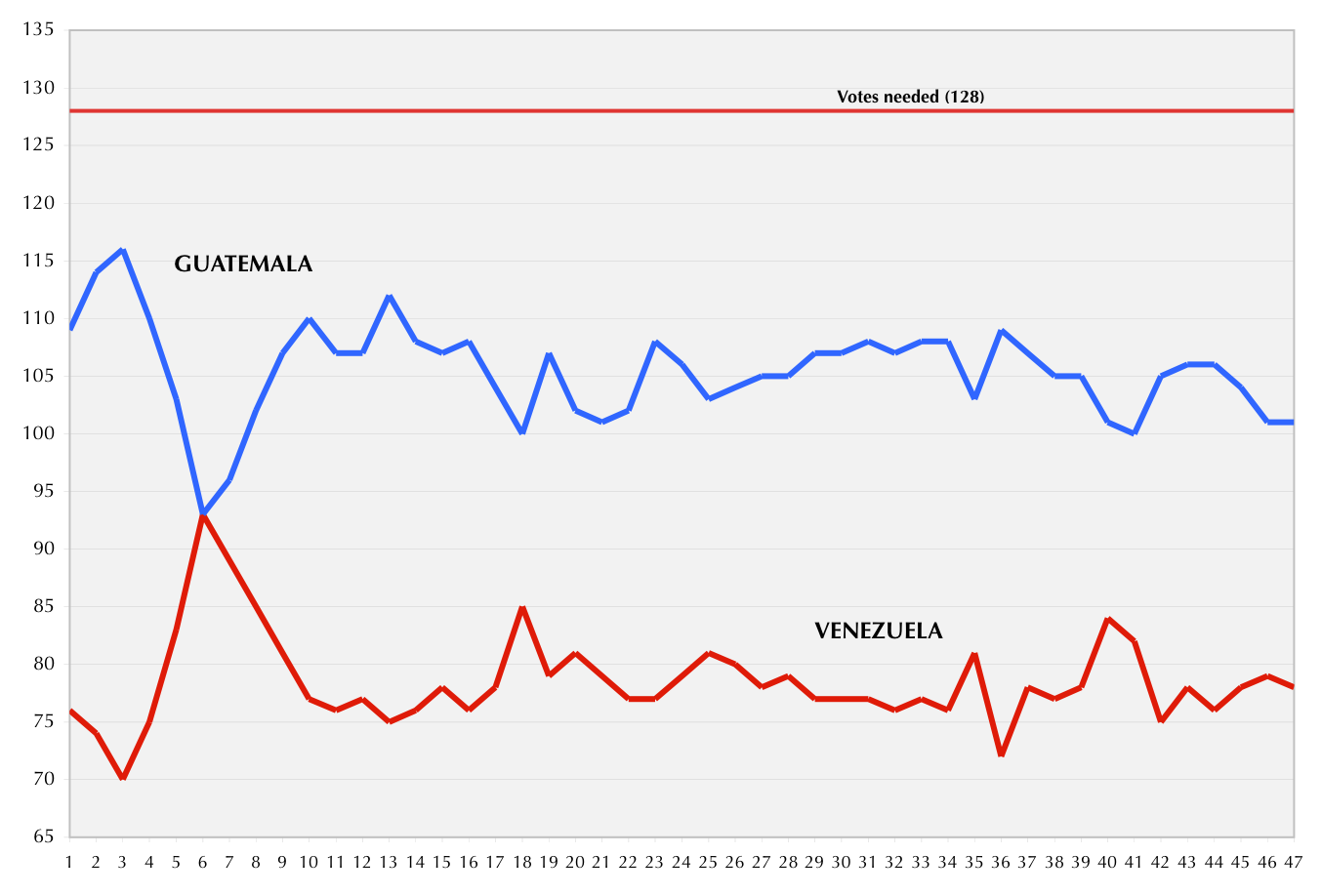
Guatemala vs. Venezuela vote breakdown

Although the results were generally more favourable to Guatemala (which received more votes in every round except the tied sixth ballot), the General Assembly was unable to produce a two-thirds majority for either candidate after repeated rounds of voting. When all the then 192 members vote, a two-thirds majority corresponds to 128 supporting votes.

==== Day 1 ====
On the first day, 16 October 2006, ten rounds were held:

Round	Votes Cast	Guatemala	Venezuela	Abstentions	Other
01	192	109	76	7	
02	192	114	74	4	
03	191	116	70	5	
04	191	110	75	6	
05	192	103	83	5	Mexico 1
06	192	93	93	5	Mexico 1
07	192	96	89	5	Mexico 1 Cuba 1
08	192	102	85	5	
09	192	107	81	4	
10	191	110	77	4	
Source: United Nations Press Release GA/10516, 16 October 2006.

The votes for Mexico and Cuba in the fifth to seventh rounds were admissible under the provision of the General Assembly's rules of procedure whereby, after three inconclusive ballots, the election may be opened to all members of the regional bloc in question, except those already holding seats on the Council and outgoing members.

==== Day 2 ====
Voting continued the following day, 17 October 2006. After the small gifts of chocolate (Venezuela) and cotton bracelets (Guatemala) distributed among the delegates on Monday, lobbying for the second day of voting was assisted by brightly coloured bookmarks (Venezuela) and a pamphlet stating its position that was distributed to the U.N. members (Guatemala).

Round	Votes Cast	Guatemala	Venezuela	Abstentions	Other
11	191	107	76	8	
12	192	107	77	7	1 invalid ballot
13	192	112	75	5	
14	191	108	76	7	
15	192	107	78	7	
16	192	108	76	8	
17	190	104	78	8	
18	191	100	85	6	
19	192	107	79	6	
20	192	102	81	9	
21	192	101	79	12	
22	191	102	77	12	
Source: United Nations Press Release GA/10517, 17 October 2006.

Following the second day of inconclusive balloting, the vote was postponed until the following Thursday, 19 October 2006. Given the high number of abstentions in the later rounds of Tuesday's voting, the BBC inferred that delegations may have been trying to send a signal that it is time to seek an alternative candidate; it mentioned the names of Costa Rica, Panama and Uruguay. A private informal meeting of the Latin American and Caribbean Group was held on 18 October, but it failed to break the deadlock. After the meeting, Mexican ambassador Enrique Berruga publicly called on Venezuela to withdraw on grounds of "diplomatic courtesy".

==== Day 3 ====
Voting recommenced on 19 October. At the start of the session, Egypt proposed deferring the vote until Monday, 23 October, because of the delays being suffered by other pending business, but this suggestion was rejected by the Assembly.

Round	Votes Cast	Guatemala	Venezuela	Abstentions	Other
23	190	108	77	5	
24	192	106	79	7	
25	192	103	81	8	
26	191	104	80	7	
27	191	105	78	8	
28	192	105	79	8	
29	192	107	77	7	Costa Rica 1
30	192	107	77	7	Bolivia 1
31	192	108	77	6	Bolivia 1
32	191	107	76	6	2 invalid ballots
33	191	108	77	6	
34	190	108	76	6	
35	191	103	81	7	
Source: United Nations Press Release GA/10519, 19 October 2006

Faced with continued deadlock, the General Assembly agreed to postpone further voting until Wednesday, 25 October, to enable the meeting to make progress with its delayed agenda on Friday and Monday, to allow the Latin American and Caribbean states to conduct negotiations towards resolving the stalemate, and to observe the scheduled one-day recess on Tuesday to mark the Eid ul-Fitr feast day at the end of Ramadan.

==== Day 4 ====
The evening before voting was scheduled to recommence, Bolivian President Evo Morales announced at a rally in El Alto that Hugo Chávez had spoken to him earlier that day and that, since it had been unable to secure a two-thirds majority, Venezuela would withdraw in favour of Bolivia. No confirmation was forthcoming from Caracas, however, and it remained unclear whether Morales meant that Bolivia would be replacing Venezuela immediately or after another round of failed voting. The same afternoon, a spokesman for the Venezuelan foreign ministry cited three conditions which would have to be met for it to withdraw:

- Guatemala would also have to withdraw.
- The United States would have to cease its campaign of "pressure and crude blackmail" on the world's governments.
- Transparent negotiations would have to be held among the Latin American and Caribbean Group members to identify the best option for proceeding.

Bolivia under Evo Morales is a close ally of Chávez's Venezuela (Chávez has spoken of an axis of good comprising the two nations, along with Cuba), and it is likely that Bolivia's candidacy would have been just as unpalatable as Venezuela's had been to those countries opposing it. As events unfolded, nothing further was heard about this putative Venezuelan withdrawal in favour of Bolivia.

Round	Votes Cast	Guatemala	Venezuela	Abstentions	Other
36	187	109	72	6	
37	192	107	78	6	Chile 1
38	187	105	77	5	
39	189	105	78	6	
40	190	101	84	5	
41	190	100	82	6	Chile 1 Dominican Rep. 1
Source: United Nations Press Release GA/10522, 25 October 2006.

After the 41st round, General Assembly President Haya Rashed Al Khalifa of Bahrain announced a deferral of further voting until Tuesday, 31 October 2006.

==== Day 5 ====
A further six rounds of inconclusive voting were held on 31 October 2006.

Round	Votes Cast	Guatemala	Venezuela	Abstentions	Other
42	186	105	75	5	Uruguay 1
43	191	106	78	4	Ecuador 2 Jamaica 1
44	190	106	76	7	Invalid 1
45	190	104	78	7	Invalid 1
46	188	101	79	8	
47	190	101	78	7	Invalid 1 Barbados 1 Ecuador 1 Uruguay 1
Source: United Nations Press Release GA/10525, 31 October 2006.

==== Day 6 ====
Voting was scheduled to recommence in the afternoon of 1 November, but a joint communiqué released by the foreign ministers of Guatemala and Venezuela shortly after noon requested that the day's balloting be suspended. They then announced that after negotiations chaired by Diego Cordovez, Ecuador's representative to the UN and chair of the Latin American and Caribbean Group, the two had agreed to withdraw their candidacies and propose Panama as a consensus candidate.

==== Day 7 ====
The GRULAC states unanimously endorsed Panama at a meeting on 3 November. Panama has served four previous terms as an elected member of the Security Council — in 1958–59, 1972–73, 1976–77 and 1981–82 — and the country's endorsement by the General Assembly on Tuesday, 7 November, was considered a formality.

Round	Votes Cast	Panama	Guatemala	Venezuela	Abstentions	Other
48	190	164	4	11	9	Barbados 1 Invalid 1
Source: United Nations Press Release GA/10528, 7 November 2006

Following the vote, Guatemala said that the three-week polarization had been "regrettable", and that it would again seek a UNSC seat for the 2012–13 rotation.

=== Historical precedents ===
In 1979, during the Cold War, a similar contest between Cuba and Colombia ran to 155 polls over a period of three months. The stalemate was finally resolved with the withdrawal of both and the election of Mexico as a compromise candidate.

With the 36th round of voting, the 2006 contest became the third longest non-permanent seat vote in UN history, passing the race for the 1956–1957 period between Yugoslavia and the Philippines. The second longest is the 52-round election between Poland and Turkey for 1960–1961. The Poland–Turkey stand-off was resolved when the contenders agreed to serve one year each; in the 1956–1957 case, it appears Yugoslavia was ultimately victorious in the vote but stood down after one year to enable the election of the Philippines to complete its term.

== See also ==
- List of members of the United Nations Security Council
- Indonesia and the United Nations
- European Union and the United Nations
