= David Osborne (Montserrat politician) =

Montserratian politician

Minister of Agriculture, Trade, Lands, Housing and the Environment
- In office 2018–2024

Member of the Legislative Assembly of Montserrat
- In office 2009–2024

Personal details
- Party: People's Democratic Movement (since 2014)
- Other political affiliations: Movement for Change and Prosperity (until 2014)
- Relations: Shirley Osborne (sister); John P. Osborne (brother)
- Parent: John Osborne (father)

David Mervyn Osborne is a Montserratian politician from the People's Democratic Movement. He was a Legislative Assembly of Montserrat and Minister of Agriculture, Trade, Lands, Housing and the Environment. He was an opposition member until losing his seat in 2024.
