= 2006 Montserratian general election =

General elections were held in Montserrat on 31 May 2006. Although the Movement for Change and Prosperity (MCAP) won the most seats (four of the nine) in the Legislative Council, the government was formed by a coalition of the Montserrat Democratic Party (MDP), the New People's Liberation Movement (NPLM) and an independent council member, who together held five seats. MDP leader Lowell Lewis became Chief Minister.

== Campaign ==
A total of 29 candidates contested the elections; the MCAP ran a full slate of nine candidates and the MDP and NPLM both nominated eight. The remaining four candidates were independents.

== Results ==
Party	Votes	%	Seats	+/–
Movement for Change and Prosperity			4	New
New People's Liberation Movement			3	–4
Montserrat Democratic Party			1	New
Independents			1	New
Total			9	0
Valid votes	2,459	98.91		
Invalid/blank votes	27	1.09		
Total votes	2,486	100.00		
Registered voters/turnout	3,331	74.63		
Source: Caribbean Elections
