= John Osborne (Montserrat politician) =

Montserratian politician (1936–2011)

John Alfred Osborne

3rd Chief Minister of Montserrat
- In office November 1978 – 10 October 1991
- Preceded by: Percival Austin Bramble
- Succeeded by: Reuben Meade
- In office 5 April 2001 – 2 June 2006
- Preceded by: David Brandt
- Succeeded by: Lowell Lewis

Personal details
- Born: John Alfred Osborne; 27 May 1935 St. Peter's, Montserrat
- Died: 2 January 2011 (aged 75) Kentucky, United States
- Party: People's Liberation Movement
- Spouse: Mary Elizabeth Eleanor Osborne née Flemming (1958). Ardith Osborne
- Children: Joan Osborne, Shirley Osborne, David Mervyn Osborne, Brenda Osborne, Donald Sylvester Osborne (Deceased), John Patrick Osborne, Audison Osborne, Tuyen Osborne, Tarique Osborne
- Occupation: Engineer, Shipwright, Businessman

John Alfred Osborne (27 May 1935 – 2 January 2011) was a chief minister of Montserrat.

He first came to that position in November 1978, as a member of the People's Liberation Movement, and continued until losing legislative council elections on 10 October 1991. By 2001 he had switched parties, joining the New People's Liberation Movement. Under his leadership, the NPLM won 7 of 9 seats in legislative council elections on 2 April 2001, and he served as chief minister from 5 April 2001 until 3 June 2006 when he resigned after elections in which his party was defeated. A major issue for his government has been the continuing recovery of the island of Montserrat after a volcanic eruption which devastated the southern part of the island, burying the capital city of Plymouth in ash and forcing its population to flee, in many cases off the island due to lack of housing. The eruption, which began in July 1995, continues today on a vastly reduced scale, the damage being confined to Plymouth and the surrounding areas. As of 2005, a new airport and docking facilities have opened and Montserratians and tourists alike are beginning to return.

In July 2008, Gerald's Airport in Montserrat was renamed John A. Osborne Airport in his honour. His daughter Shirley Osborne is the Speaker of the Legislative Assembly of Montserrat.

Political offices
Preceded by Percival Austin Bramble	Chief Minister of Montserrat; 1978–1991	Succeeded by Reuben Meade
Preceded by David Brandt	Chief Minister of Montserrat; 2001–2006	Succeeded by Lowell Lewis
