= Premier of Montserrat =

Head of government of Montserrat

- Coat of arms of Montserrat

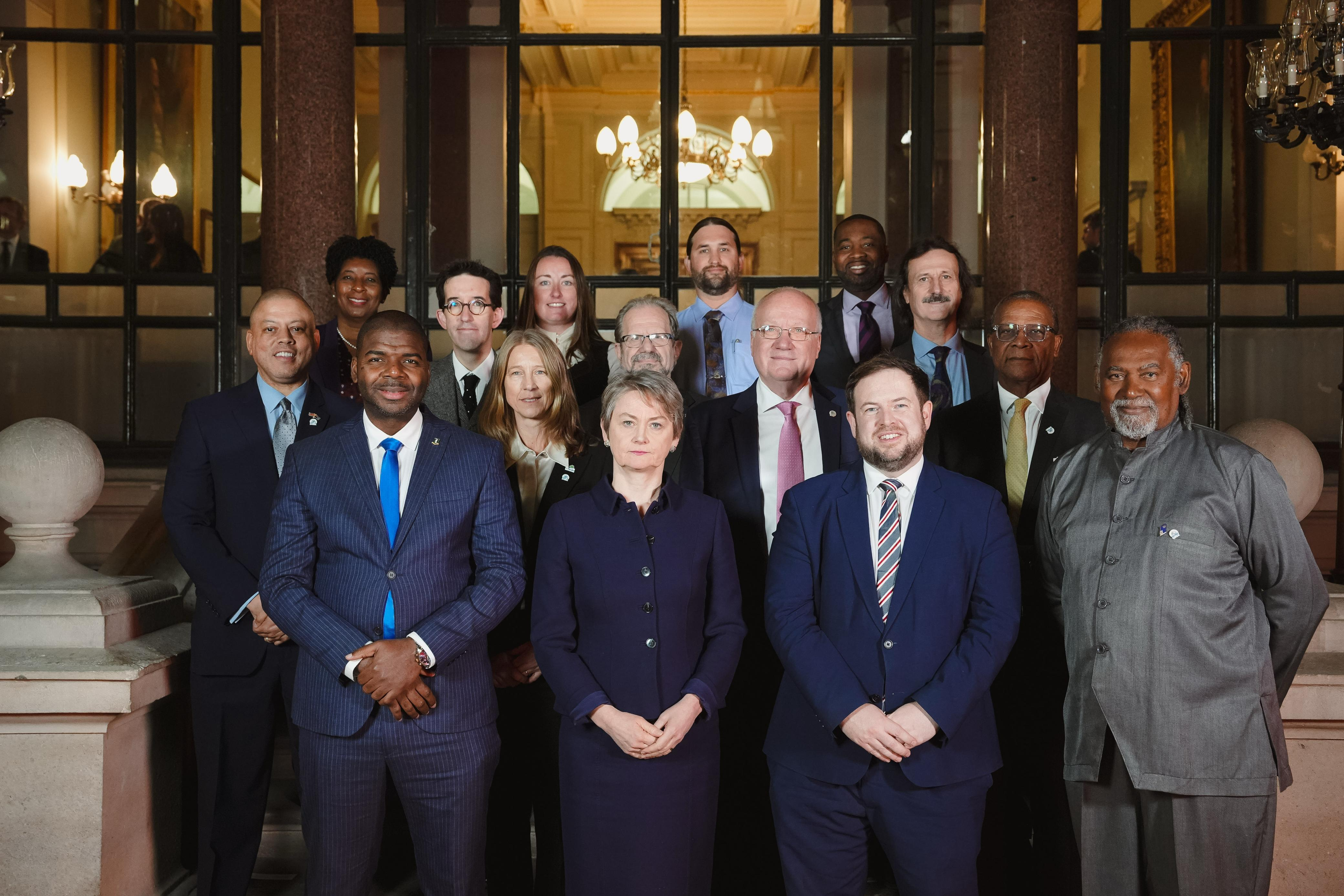
- Incumbent; Reuben Meade since 25 October 2024
- Style: The Honourable
- Appointer: Governor of Montserrat
- Term length: At the governor's pleasure
- Formation: January 1960
- First holder: William Henry Bramble as Chief Minister
- Website: Office of the Premier

The premier of Montserrat, formerly the chief minister of Montserrat, is the head of government in the British Overseas Territory of Montserrat. The Premier is appointed by the Governor of Montserrat on behalf of the monarch of the United Kingdom, and is usually the member of the Legislative Assembly of Montserrat who commands majority support.

William Henry Bramble was the inaugural holder of the position in 1960. Reuben Meade was the chief minister when the name change happened in 2011, and was officially the first premier of the territory. Meade has been the longest serving premier and is the incumbent, serving his third term since October 2024.

== Overview and appointment ==
The Premier is the head of government in Montserrat, a self-governing British Overseas Territory. The Premier is appointed by the Governor of Montserrat on behalf of the monarch of the United Kingdom. The Legislative Assembly of Montserrat has 12 seats with nine members elected through direct voting from single-seat constituencies, an externally elected speaker, attorney general, and finance secretary. The Premier is usually the member of the House of Assembly whose party or coalition commands a simple majority.

== Historical development ==
In 1936, the first representative government was reintroduced in Montserrat with a minority of elected members. In 1951, significant changes were enacted following protests by local people, which introduced voting rights and the establishment of a Legislative Council, where the majority consisted of elected members for the first time. In 1959, further changes allowed for a ministerial system of government led by a chief minister and William Henry Bramble became the territory's first chief minister in January 1960. After a decade in office, Bramble was succeeded by his son, Percival Austin Bramble, in 1970.

John Osborne became the chief minister in 1978. In 1989, the Montserrat Constitution was established and Osborne was the first chief minister to operate under the constitution. Reuben Meade took over as premier in 1991, and during Meade's second term, a new constitution was adopted in 2011. As per the new constitution, the Legislative Council was renamed as Montserrat Legislative Assembly and the office of the chief minister was officially renamed as Premier of Montserrat. A position of Deputy Premier was introduced to support the premier. Meade has been the longest serving premier and is the incumbent, serving his third term since October 2024.

== List ==
MLP PDP PLM NPP MNR NPLM MDP MCAP PDM UA

No.	Portrait	Name (Birth–Death)	Term of office (Note: Date in italics indicate de facto continuation of office)			Political party	Elected	Notes
No.	Portrait	Name (Birth–Death)	Took office	Left office	Time in office	Political party	Elected	Notes
Chief Ministers (1960–2011)
1		William Henry Bramble (1901–1988)	January 1960	December 1970	10 years, 11 months	Montserrat Labour Party	— 1961; 1966	
2		Percival Austin Bramble (born 1931)	December 1970	November 1978	7 years, 11 months	Progressive Democratic Party	1970; 1973	
3		John Osborne (1935–2011)	November 1978	10 October 1991	12 years, 11 months	People's Liberation Movement	1978; 1983; 1987	First tenure
4		Reuben Meade (born 1954)	10 October 1991	13 November 1996	5 years, 34 days	National Progressive Party	1991	First tenure
5		Bertrand Osborne (1935–2018)	13 November 1996	22 August 1997	282 days	Movement for National Reconstruction	1996	
6		David Brandt	22 August 1997	5 April 2001	3 years, 226 days	Independent	—	
(3)		John Osborne (1935–2011)	5 April 2001	2 June 2006	5 years, 58 days	New People's Liberation Movement	2001	Second tenure
7		Lowell Lewis (born 1952)	2 June 2006	10 September 2009	3 years, 100 days	Montserrat Democratic Party	2006	
(4)		Reuben Meade (born 1954)	10 September 2009	27 September 2011	2 years, 17 days	Movement for Change and Prosperity	2009	Second tenure
Premiers (2011–present)
1		Reuben Meade (born 1954)	27 November 2011	12 September 2014	2 years, 289 days	Movement for Change and Prosperity	—	First tenure
2		Donaldson Romeo (born 1962)	12 September 2014	19 November 2019	5 years, 68 days	People's Democratic Movement	2014	
3		Easton Taylor-Farrell	19 November 2019	25 October 2024	4 years, 341 days	Movement for Change and Prosperity	2019	
(1)		Reuben Meade (born 1954)	25 October 2024	Incumbent	1 year, 358 days	United Alliance	2024	Second tenure

== See also ==
- List of current heads of government in the United Kingdom and dependencies
- List of leaders of dependent territories
