= Shirley Osborne =

Shirley Osborne is a politician in Montserrat. She was Speaker of the Legislative Assembly of Montserrat between September 2014 and October 2019. She is the daughter of the late John Osborne, a former Chief Minister of Montserrat.

Osborne trained as a teacher and in 1995 received an MBA from Simmons School of Management. She has served as Executive Director of the Women’s Resource Centre in St Peters.

In 2016, Osborne and a friend, hiking in a wooded area near Soldier Ghaut (a seasonal streambed) in the northwest area of the island, discovered nine petroglyphs, known as the Soldier Ghaut petroglyphs.
