= Justin Cassell =

Justin "Hero" Cassell was a Montserratian calypsonian, popularly regarded as one of the pioneers of calypso from Montserrat. He began performing in the 1950s. His brother is the musician Arrow.

Cassell won Montserrat's calypso crown more often than anyone else. During the 1970s and 80s, he was part of a rivalry with the calypsonian musician Reality.

Cassell died on the 5th February 2024 at the age of 80.
