= List of Commonwealth of Nations prime ministers =

This is a list of the prime ministers of the Commonwealth of Nations in order of appointment.

== List ==
Nation	Head of government	Name of head of government	In office since
Brunei	Prime Minister	(Sultan) Hassanal Bolkiah	1 January 1984
Dominica	Prime Minister	Roosevelt Skerrit	8 January 2004
India	Prime Minister	Narendra Modi	26 May 2014
Antigua and Barbuda	Prime Minister	Gaston Browne	13 June 2014
Tanzania	Prime Minister	Kassim Majaliwa	20 November 2015
Jamaica	Prime Minister	Andrew Holness	3 March 2016
Barbados	Prime Minister	Mia Mottley	24 May 2018
Cameroon	Prime Minister	Joseph Ngute	4 January 2019
Papua New Guinea	Prime Minister	James Marape	30 May 2019
Malta	Prime Minister	Robert Abela	13 January 2020
Guyana	Prime Minister	Mark Phillips	2 August 2020
Belize	Prime Minister	Johnny Briceño	12 November 2020
Uganda	Prime Minister	Robinah Nabbanja	21 June 2021
Saint Lucia	Prime Minister	Philip Pierre	28 July 2021
Bahamas	Prime Minister	Philip Davis	16 September 2021
Australia	Prime Minister	Anthony Albanese	23 May 2022
Grenada	Prime Minister	Dickon Mitchell	24 June 2022
Saint Kitts and Nevis	Prime Minister	Terrance Drew	6 August 2022
Lesotho	Prime Minister	Sam Matekane	28 October 2022
Malaysia	Prime Minister	Anwar Ibrahim	24 November 2022
Eswatini	Prime Minister	Russell Dlamini	7 November 2023
New Zealand	Prime Minister	Christopher Luxon	27 November 2023
Tuvalu	Prime Minister	Feleti Teo	26 February 2024
Pakistan	Prime Minister	Shehbaz Sharif	4 March 2024
Solomon Islands	Prime Minister	Jeremiah Manele	2 May 2024
Singapore	Prime Minister	Lawrence Wong	15 May 2024
Bangladesh	Chief Adviser	Muhammad Yunus	8 August 2024
Sri Lanka	Prime Minister	Harini Amarasuriya	24 September 2024
Mauritius	Prime Minister	Navin Ramgoolam	12 November 2024
Mozambique	Prime Minister	Maria Benvinda Levy	15 January 2025
Tonga	Prime Minister	ʻAisake Eke	22 January 2025
Vanuatu	Prime Minister	Jotham Napat	11 February 2025
Canada	Prime Minister	Mark Carney	14 March 2025
Namibia	Prime Minister	Elijah Ngurare	21 March 2025
Trinidad and Tobago	Prime Minister	Kamla Persad-Bissessar	1 May 2025
Rwanda	Prime Minister	Justin Nsengiyumva	25 July 2025
Samoa	Prime Minister	Laʻauli Leuatea Schmidt	16 September 2025
Saint Vincent and the Grenadines	Prime Minister	Godwin Friday	28 November 2025
United Kingdom	Prime Minister	Andy Burnham	20 July 2026

== See also ==
- List of prime ministers of Elizabeth II
- List of prime ministers of Charles III
