= John P. Osborne =

Montserratian politician

Minister of Agriculture, Lands, Housing, Environment, and Sports
- Incumbent
- Assumed office 27 October 2024

Member of the Legislative Assembly of Montserrat
- Incumbent
- Assumed office 24 October 2024

Personal details
- Party: United Alliance
- Parent: John Osborne (father)

John P. Osborne is a Montserratian politician from the United Alliance. Since 2024, he has been a Legislative Assembly of Montserrat and Minister of Agriculture, Lands, Housing, Environment, and Sports.
