= New People's Liberation Movement =

The New People's Liberation Movement was a political party in Montserrat led by John Osborne.

== History ==
The NPLM was established in 2001 by a merger of the People's Progressive Alliance and the Movement for National Reconstruction, with PPA leader John Osborne becoming leader of the new party. In the elections later that year, it received 52% of the vote and won seven of the nine seats in the Legislative Council, resulting in Osborne becoming Chief Minister.

In the 2006 elections, the party was reduced to three seats. Although it was able to form a coalition government with the Montserrat Democratic Party (which had one seat) and an independent MP, Osborne stepped down as Chief Minister and MDP leader Lowell Lewis became Chief Minister.
