= Crenston Buffonge =

Montserratian footballer

Personal information
- Date of birth: 13 October 1974 (age 52)
- Position: Defender

International career
Years	Team	Apps	(Gls)
2000–2004	Montserrat	3	(0)

Crenston Buffonge (13 October 1974) is a Montserratian former footballer who played as a defender.

== International career ==
Buffonge played for Montserrat in 2000 against the Dominican Republic in both legs of the qualifiers for the 2002 FIFA World Cup.
