= Movement for Change and Prosperity =

- Abbreviation: MCAP
- Leader: Samuel Joseph
- Founded: 2005
- Preceded by: National Progressive Party
- Colours: Yellow; Green
- Legislative Assembly: 1 / 9

Website
- www.mcap.ms

The Movement for Change and Prosperity (MCAP) is a political party in Montserrat.

== History ==
The party was established in 2005 as a successor to the National Progressive Party. In the 2006 elections it received 36.1% of the vote, winning four seats. Although it was the largest party in the Legislative Council, a coalition government was formed by the Montserrat Democratic Party (MDP), the New People's Liberation Movement (NPLM) and an independent MP.

In the 2009 elections, the MCAP won six of the nine seats, with its then leader Reuben Meade becoming Chief Minister. However, the 2014 elections saw the party reduced to two seats.

In the 2019 elections the MCAP won five out of nine seats, with its new leader Easton Taylor-Farrell becoming the new Premier.

In March 2024, Samuel Joseph became the party leader. In the 2024 elections, the party won only one seat.

== Election results ==
=== Legislative Assembly elections ===
Election	Leader	Votes	%	Seats	+/–	Government
2006	Reuben Meade			4 / 9	New	Opposition
2009	Reuben Meade	10,139	52.64 (#1)	6 / 9	▲2	Government
2014	Reuben Meade	8,319	35.47 (#2)	2 / 9	▼4	Opposition
2019	Easton Taylor-Farrell	8,511	42.66 (#1)	5 / 9	▲3	Government
2024	Samuel Joseph	5,487	27.68 (#3)	1 / 9	▼4	Opposition
