= Montserrat Democratic Party =

Political party

The Montserrat Democratic Party (MDP) was a political party in Montserrat, a British territory in the Caribbean.

== History ==
The Montserrat Democratic Party was established in 1958 and led by Eric Kelsick. It was the second party founded in the country after the Montserrat Labour Party. In the May 1958 elections, it put forward two candidates, but received only 12% of the vote and failed to win a seat.

The party was re-established in 2006. In the elections held later that year, it received 24.4% of the vote, winning one seat in the Legislative Council. Following the elections, it joined a coalition government with the New People's Liberation Movement (NPLM) and an independent MP. Although the NPLM had won three seats, MDP leader Lowell Lewis became Chief Minister.

The MDP has not contested an election since 2006. In the 2009 elections, Lewis ran as an independent and was elected.
