= Samuel Joseph (Montserrat politician) =

Montserratian politician

Member of the Legislative Assembly of Montserrat
- In office 2014–2024

Personal details
- Party: Movement for Change and Prosperity

Samuel Joseph is a Montserratian politician who was a Legislative Assembly of Montserrat. He is the leader of the Movement for Change and Prosperity.

He was an deputy premier until losing his seat in 2024.
