= Paul Lewis (politician) =

Montserratian politician

Leader of the Opposition in the Legislative Assembly of Montserrat
- Incumbent
- Assumed office 2019

Personal details
- Party: People's Democratic Movement

Paul Lewis is a Montserratian politician who is leader of the People's Democratic Movement and leader of the opposition in the Legislative Assembly of Montserrat since 2019.
