= Lowell Lewis =

Lowell Lyttleton Lewis (born August 18, 1952) was a politician, a former Chief Minister of Montserrat. He is the Chief Medical Officer of Montserrat.

== Chief Minister of Montserrat ==
Lewis first elected in April 2001, took office as Chief Minister on 2 June 2006. At the time, he headed a coalition government consisting of his party, the Montserrat Democratic Party (MDP), the former ruling New People's Liberation Movement (NPLM), and an independent legislator, Mr David Brandt.

A snap election was called during his term, and was held on 8 September 2009. Reuben Meade was sworn in as new Chief Minister before becoming the first Premier of Montserrat. Dr Lewis was re-elected as an independent candidate, but subsequently lost his seat at the general election of September 2014.

Preceded by John Osborne	Chief Minister of Montserrat; 2006–2009	Succeeded by Reuben Meade
