= United Alliance (Montserrat) =

- Abbreviation: UA
- Leader: Reuben Meade
- Founder: Reuben Meade
- Founded: 2024
- Split from: MCAP
- Colours: Blue; Green
- Legislative Assembly: 5 / 9

Website
- unitedalliance.dcms.site

The United Alliance (UA) is a political party in Montserrat.

== History ==
The party was founded in early 2024. It is led by former Premier Reuben Meade.

In the 2024 Montserratian general election, the United Alliance won the most seats in the Legislative Assembly, five out of nine.

== Election results ==
=== Legislative Assembly elections ===
Election	Leader	Votes	%	Seats	+/–	Government
2024	Reuben Meade	7,676	38.72 (#1)	5 / 9	New	Government
