= Easton Taylor-Farrell =

Montserratian politician

The Honourable Easton Taylor-Farrell MLA
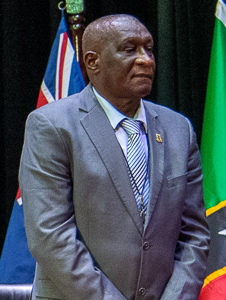
- Taylor-Farrell in 2022

Premier of Montserrat
- In office 19 November 2019 – 25 October 2024
- Monarchs: Elizabeth II; Charles III
- Governor: Andrew Pearce (2018–2022); Sarah Tucker (2022–2024)
- Preceded by: Donaldson Romeo
- Succeeded by: Reuben Meade

Leader of the Opposition
- In office 2017–2019
- Preceded by: Reuben Meade
- Succeeded by: Paul Lewis

Personal details
- Born: Joseph Easton Taylor-Farrell Plymouth, Montserrat
- Party: Movement for Change and Prosperity
- Occupation: Politician and businessman

Joseph Easton Taylor-Farrell is a Montserratian politician who served as the premier of Montserrat between 2019 and 2024. Before entering politics, he was a businessman.

He once served as the leader of the opposition of the island's Legislative Assembly from 2017 to November 2019. He was the leader of the Movement for Change and Prosperity political party between 2019 and 2024, having succeeded the island's former premier Reuben Meade. Previously, Farrell served as the island's Minister of Agriculture, Lands, Housing and the Environment.
