= Reuben Meade =

Montserratian politician

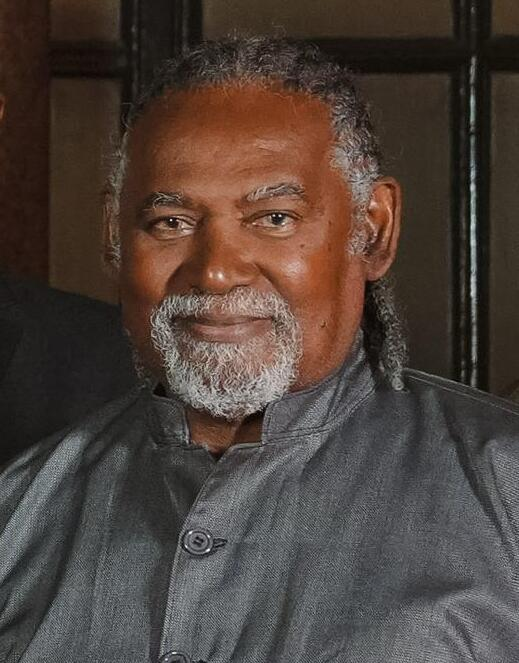
- Meade in 2025

4th Chief Minister of Montserrat 1st Premier of Montserrat
- Incumbent
- Assumed office 25 October 2024
- Monarch: Charles III
- Governor: Sarah Tucker; Harriet Cross
- Preceded by: Easton Taylor-Farrell
- In office 10 September 2009 – 12 September 2014
- Monarch: Elizabeth II
- Governor: Peter Waterworth; Adrian Davis
- Preceded by: Lowell Lewis
- Succeeded by: Donaldson Romeo
- In office 10 October 1991 – 13 November 1996
- Monarch: Elizabeth II
- Governor: David G. P. Taylor; Frank Savage
- Preceded by: John Osborne
- Succeeded by: Bertrand Osborne

Personal details
- Born: Reuben Theodore Meade; 7 March 1954 (age 72)
- Party: United Alliance (since 2024)
- Other political affiliations: MCAP (2005–c. 2024); NPP (1991–2005)
- Spouse: Joan DelSol Meade
- Education: University of the West Indies (BGS); McGill University; University of Bradford

Reuben Theodore Meade (born 7 March 1954) is a Montserratian politician who has been the 4th Chief Minister and 1st Premier of Montserrat from 1991 to 1996, 2009 to 2014, and since 2024. He has been a member of the Movement for Change and Prosperity (MCAP), National Progressive Party, and United Alliance (UA). After losing the 2014 election he stepped down as leader of MCAP, but returned to politics as leader of the UA in the 2024 election.

== Early life and education ==
Reuben Theodore Meade was born on 7 March 1954. He graduated from the University of the West Indies with a bachelor of general studies, from McGill University with a degree in agriculture economics, and from the University of Bradford with a degree in banking and finance.

== Career ==
From 1989 to 1991, Meade was director of development at the Ministry of Finance in Montserrat. He was a member of the National Progressive Party.

In the 1996 election Meade won a seat in the Legislative Assembly of Montserrat. During his tenure in the assembly he was leader of the opposition. From 2007 to 2009, he was Minister of Agriculture, Land, Housing and the Environment.

Meade served as Chief Minister from 1991 to 1996, and from 2009 to the disestablishment of the office. He was the Premier of Montserrat until 2014. He attended the wedding of Prince William and Catherine Middleton in 2011. A motion of no confidence against Meade failed by a 7 to 2 vote on 26 June 2012. Meade stepped down as the leader of the Movement for Change and Prosperity after losing the 2014 election.

The United Alliance, under the leadership of Meade, won the 2024 election.

== Personal life ==
Meade is married.

== Works cited ==
=== News ===
- "Election day in Montserrat". Nation News. 18 November 2019. Archived from the original on 9 July 2025.
- "Former premier leads new party to victory". The Gleaner. 26 October 2024. Archived from the original on 31 May 2025.
- "Former premier returns to active politics". The Gleaner. 26 January 2024. Archived from the original on 27 January 2024.
- "Meade is Montserrat's first Premier". Nation News. 27 September 2011. Archived from the original on 9 July 2025.
- "Royal wedding guest list". BBC. 26 October 2024. Archived from the original on 5 February 2023.
- Martindale, Carol (27 June 2012). "Meade survives no-confidence vote". Nation News. Archived from the original on 28 June 2022.

=== Web ===
- "Montserrat". Caribbean Community. Archived from the original on 20 November 2010.
