= People's Democratic Movement (Montserrat) =

- Abbreviation: PDM
- Leader: Paul Lewis
- Founder: Donaldson Romeo
- Founded: 30 April 2014
- Ideology: Autonomy for Montserrat
- Colours: Red; Black
- Legislative Assembly: 3 / 9

Website
- pdmmontserrat.com

The People's Democratic Movement (PDM) is a political party in Montserrat.

== History ==
The party was established by the then leader of the opposition Donaldson Romeo on 30 April 2014, in order to contest the upcoming elections. The elections saw the party win seven of the nine seats in the Legislative Council, becoming the ruling party. However, two party members, Ingrid Buffonge and Gregory Willock, later left the party to join the opposition.

== Election results ==
=== Legislative Assembly ===
Election	Leader	Votes	%	Seats	+/–	Status
2014	Donaldson Romeo	11,702	49.90 (#2)	7 / 9	New	Government
2019	Paul Lewis	5,969	29.92 (#2)	3 / 9	▼3	Opposition
2024	Paul Lewis	5,739	28.95 (#3)	3 / 9	0	Opposition
