= Legislative Assembly of Montserrat =

Nine-member legislature in Montserrat

Type
- Type: Unicameral

History
- Founded: 2011
- Preceded by: Legislative Council

Leadership
- Speaker: Marjorie Smith, UA since 8 November 2024
- Premier: Reuben Meade, UA since 25 October 2024
- Leader of the Opposition: Paul Lewis, PDM since 2019

Structure
- Seats: 9 seats
- Political groups: His Majesty's Government: United Alliance (5); His Majesty's Loyal Opposition: People's Democratic Movement (3); Movement for Change and Prosperity (1); Others: Ex-officio (2)

Elections
- Voting system: Plurality-at-large voting
- Last election: 24 October 2024
- Next election: TBA

Website
- www.parliament.ms

The Legislative Assembly is the legislature of Montserrat. A unicameral body, it has nine elected members.

== History ==
The Legislative Assembly was established following the promulgation of a new constitution in 2011, replacing the Legislative Council. The first elections to it were held in 2014, and the most recent being in 2024.

== Electoral system ==
The nine members of the Legislative Assembly are elected in a single constituency, with voters having the opportunity to vote for up to nine candidates under plurality-at-large voting.

== See also ==
- List of speakers of the Legislative Assembly of Montserrat
