= 2021 in Montserrat =

- Decades: 2000s; 2010s; 2020s
- See also: Other events of 2021; Timeline of Montserrat history

Events in the year 2021 in Montserrat.

== Incumbents ==
- Monarch: Elizabeth II
- Governor: Andrew Pearce
- Premier: Easton Taylor-Farrell

== Events ==
- 17 March: The flag of Montserrat is raised in New Palace Yard, London for the first time.
- 13 August: Hurricane Grace triggers a huricane watch in Montserrat.
