= 2022 in Montserrat =

- Decades: 2000s; 2010s; 2020s
- See also: Other events of 2022; Timeline of Montserrat history

Events in the year 2022 in Montserrat.

== Incumbents ==
- Monarch: Elizabeth II (until 8 September); Charles III onwards
- Governor: Andrew Pearce (until 7 March); Sarah Tucker onwards
- Premier: Easton Taylor-Farrell

== Events ==
- 8 September: Queen Elizabeth II dies at Balmoral Castle, Aberdeenshire, Scotland, with her son Charles III taking over as monarch.
- 19 September: Governor Sarah Tucker and premier Easton Taylor-Farrell attend the funeral of Elizabeth II in London.
