= 2024 in Montserrat =

- Decades: 2000s; 2010s; 2020s
- See also: Other events of 2024; Timeline of Montserrat history

Events in the year 2024 in Montserrat.

== Incumbents ==
- Monarch: Charles III
- Governor: Sarah Tucker
- Premier: Easton Taylor-Farrell (until 24 October); Reuben Meade onwards.

== Events ==
- 24 October: 2024 Montserratian general election.
