= Monarchies in the Americas =

Countries in the Americas which are monarchies

The Commonwealth of Nations, some of whose countries in America are monarchies, including: Antigua and Barbuda, The Bahamas, Belize, Canada, Grenada, Jamaica, Saint Kitts and Nevis, Saint Lucia, Saint Vincent and the Grenadines, and the British Overseas Territories. (Not shown: the Falkland Islands and South Georgia and the South Sandwich Islands in the South Atlantic Ocean).

The Dutch Caribbean islands, under the Monarchy of the Netherlands Aruba Curaçao Sint Maarten Caribbean Netherlands

Greenland is a constituent country of the Danish Realm in North America, which has the Danish monarchy

There are 12 monarchies in the Americas, being either sovereign states or self-governing territories that have a monarch as head of state. Each is a constitutional monarchy, wherein the monarch inherits his or her office according to law, usually keeping it until death or abdication, and is bound by laws and customs in the exercise of their powers. Ten of these monarchies are part of the global personal union known as the Commonwealth realms and share Charles III, who resides in the United Kingdom, as king. The other two are the Monarchy of the Netherlands which is used in states of the Dutch Caribbean, and the Monarchy of Denmark which is used in Greenland. As such, none of the monarchies in the Americas have a permanently residing monarch, though the Commonwealth realms each have a resident governor-general to represent King Charles III and perform most of his constitutional duties in his name; and a high commissioner represents the King of Denmark and the Danish government in Greenland. Additionally, each of Canada's 10 provinces functions as a subnational constituent monarchy, with the constitutional powers vested in the King exercised at the provincial level by a lieutenant governor.

Historically, some pre-Columbian societies existed under monarchical forms of government, while others had a decentralised collection of tribal regions under a hereditary chieftain. None of the contemporary monarchies, however, are descended from those pre-colonial royal systems, instead either having their historical roots in European monarchies which colonized the New World beginning in the 15th century.

From that date on, through the Age of Discovery, European colonization brought extensive American territory under the control of Europe's monarchs (although for much of this era, the Dutch Republic was not a monarchy). The majority of these colonies eventually gained independence from their rulers. Some did so via armed conflict with their mother countries, as in the American Revolution and the Latin American wars of independence, usually severing all ties to the overseas monarchies in the process (today, none of the Latin American nations that were former Spanish colonies share a personal union with the Spanish monarchy). Others gained full sovereignty by legislative paths, such as Canada's patriation of its constitution from the United Kingdom. A number of former colonies became republics immediately upon achieving self-governance. Haiti and Brazil formed constitutional monarchies with their own resident monarchs, though both eventually became republics, and Mexico had two short-lived Mexican Empires propped up by foreign intervention before returning to a republican form of government.

== Current monarchies ==
=== Commonwealth monarchies ===
Various countries of the Commonwealth of Nations all have legally independent monarchies, but with succession rules kept in synchronization with other countries that ensure they all have the same monarch (as of 2024, Charles III, who largely presides from the United Kingdom). The monarch's day-to-day governmental and ceremonial duties are generally carried out by an appointed local viceroy or governor-general.

==== Antigua and Barbuda ====
The monarchy of Antigua and Barbuda has the roots in the monarchy of Spain, which initially founded the colony in the late 15th century and later the monarchy of the United Kingdom, of which the islands were later a Crown colony. On 1 November 1981, the country gained independence from the United Kingdom, retaining the then reigning monarch, Elizabeth II, as monarch of the newly created monarchy of Antigua and Barbuda. The monarch is represented in the country by the Governor-General of Antigua and Barbuda, Sir Rodney Williams.

Elizabeth and her royal consort, Prince Philip, Duke of Edinburgh, included Antigua and Barbuda in their 1966 Caribbean tour, and again in the Queen's Silver Jubilee tour of October 1977. Elizabeth returned once more in 1985. For the country's 25th anniversary of independence, on 30 October 2006, Prince Edward, Earl of Wessex, opened Antigua and Barbuda's new parliament building, reading a message from his mother, the Queen. The Duke of York visited Antigua and Barbuda in January 2001.

==== The Bahamas ====
The monarchy of the Bahamas has the roots in the monarchy of Spain, which initially founded the colony in the late 15th century and later the monarchy of the United Kingdom, of which the islands were later a Crown colony after 1717. On 10 July 1973, the country gained independence from the United Kingdom, retaining the then reigning monarch, Elizabeth II, as monarch of the newly formed monarchy of The Bahamas. The monarch is represented in the country by the Governor-General of the Bahamas, currently Cynthia A. Pratt.

==== Belize ====
Belize was, until the 15th century, a part of the Mayan Empire, containing smaller states headed by a hereditary ruler known as an ajaw (later k’uhul ajaw). (Note: Both terms appear in early Colonial texts (including Papeles de Paxbolón) where they are used as synonyms of Aztec and Spanish terms for supreme rulers and their domains – tlahtoani (Tlatoani) and tlahtocayotl, rey, or magestad and reino, señor and señorío, or dominio.) The present monarchy of Belize has its roots in the Spanish monarchy, under the authority of which the area was first colonised in the 16th century, and later the British monarchy, as a Crown colony. On 21 September 1981, the country (known until then as British Honduras) gained independence from the United Kingdom, retaining the then reigning monarch, Elizabeth II, as monarch of the newly formed monarchy of Belize. The monarch is represented in the country by the Governor-General of Belize, Her Excellency Froyla Tzalam.

==== Canada ====
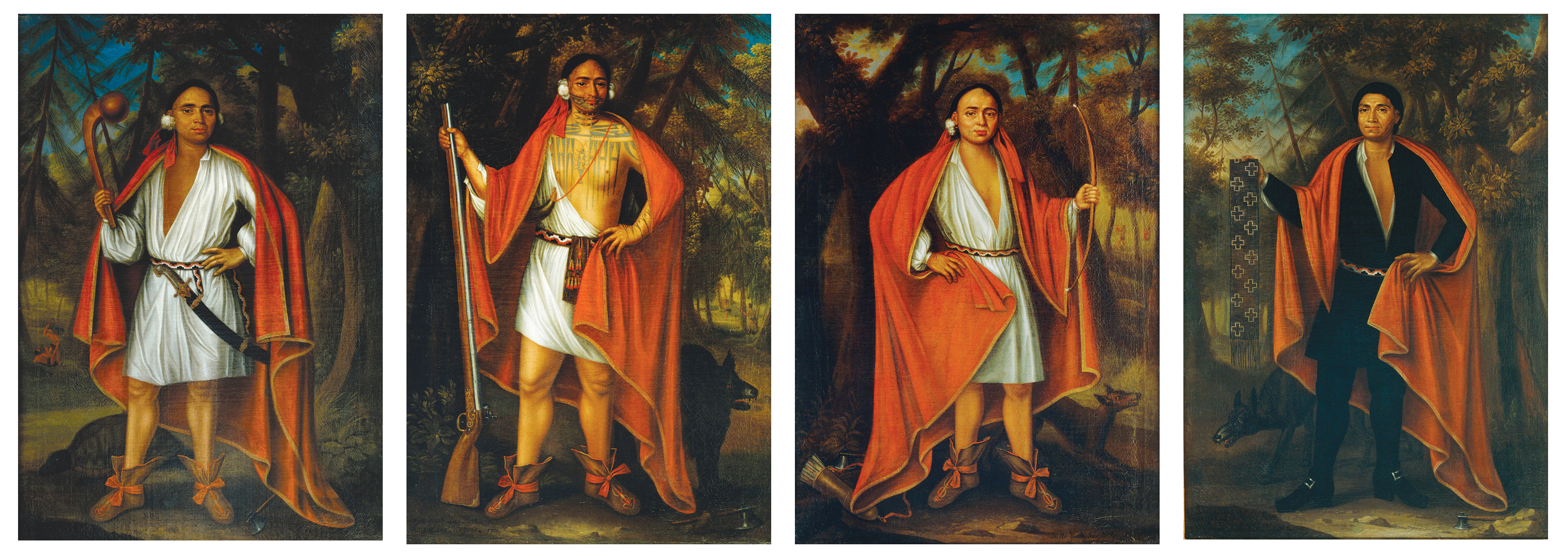
Painting of the Four Mohawk Kings, done during their visit with Queen Anne in 1710

Canada's aboriginal peoples had systems of governance organised in a fashion similar to the Occidental concept of monarchy; European explorers often referred to hereditary leaders of tribes as kings. The present monarchy of Canada has its roots in the French and English monarchies, under the authority of which the area was colonised in the 16th–18th centuries, and, later, the British monarchy. The country became a self-governing confederation on 1 July 1867, recognised as a kingdom in its own right, but did not have full legislative autonomy from the British Parliament until the passage of the Statute of Westminster on 11 December 1931, retaining the then-reigning monarch, George V, as monarch of the newly formed monarchy of Canada. The monarch is represented in the country by the governor general of Canada (Currently Louise Arbour) and in each of the provinces by a lieutenant governor.

==== Grenada ====
The monarchy of Grenada has its roots in the French monarchy, under the authority of which the islands were first colonised in the mid 17th century, and later the English and then British monarchy, as a Crown colony. On 7 February 1974, the country gained independence from the United Kingdom, retaining the then reigning monarch, Elizabeth II, as monarch of the newly created monarchy of Grenada. The monarch is represented in the country by the Governor-General of Grenada, currently Dame Cécile La Grenade.

==== Jamaica ====
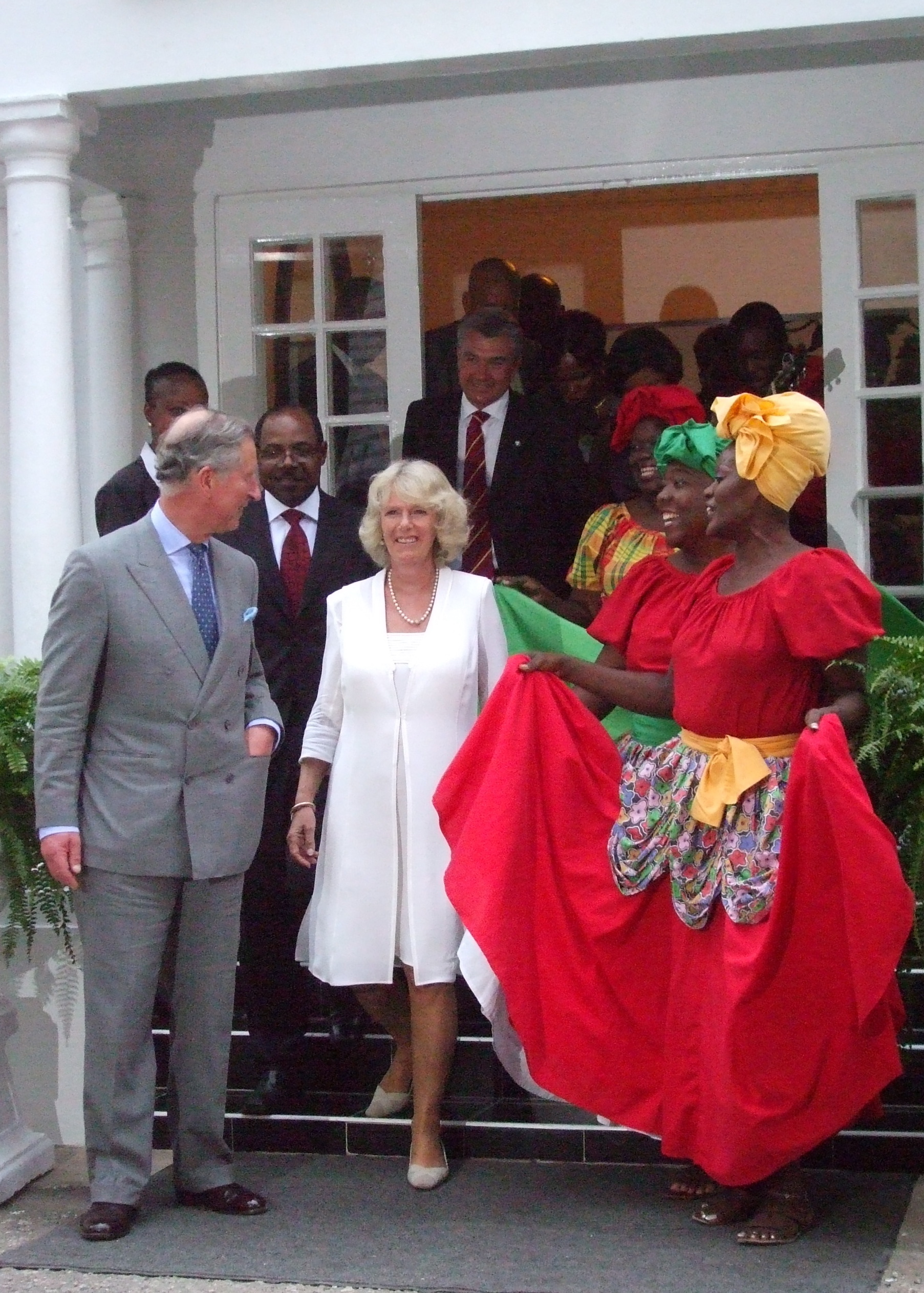
Prince Charles (far left), the heir to the Jamaican throne, and his wife, Camilla (centre), at the Half Moon Hotel, Montego Bay, 13 March 2008

The monarchy of Jamaica has its roots in the Spanish monarchy, under the authority of which the islands were first colonised in the late 16th century, and later the English and then British monarchy, as a Crown colony. On 6 August 1962, the country gained independence from the United Kingdom, retaining the then reigning monarch, Elizabeth II, as monarch of the newly created monarchy of Jamaica. The monarch is represented in the country by the Governor-General of Jamaica, Sir Patrick Allen.

Former Prime Minister of Jamaica Portia Simpson-Miller had expressed an intention to oversee the process required to change Jamaica to a republic by 2012; she originally stated this would be complete by August of that year. In 2003, former Prime Minister P.J. Patterson, advocated making Jamaica into a republic by 2007.

==== Saint Kitts and Nevis ====
The monarchy of Saint Kitts and Nevis has its roots in the English and French monarchies, under the authority of which the islands were first colonised in the early 17th century, and later the British monarchy, as a Crown colony. On 19 September 1983, the country gained independence from the United Kingdom, retaining the then reigning monarch, Elizabeth II, as monarch of the newly created monarchy of Saint Kitts and Nevis. The monarch is represented in the country by the Governor-General of Saint Kitts and Nevis, currently Dame Marcella Liburd

==== Saint Lucia ====
The Caribs who occupied the island of Saint Lucia in pre-Columbian times had a complex society, with hereditary kings and shamans. The present monarchy has its roots in the Dutch, French, and English monarchies, under the authority of which the island was first colonised in 1605, and later the British monarchy, as a Crown colony. On 22 February 1979, the country gained independence from the United Kingdom, retaining the then reigning monarch, Elizabeth II, as monarch of the newly created monarchy of Saint Lucia. The monarch is represented in the country by the Governor-General of Saint Lucia, currently Sir Errol Charles.

==== Saint Vincent and the Grenadines ====
The present monarchy of Saint Vincent and the Grenadines has its roots in the French monarchy, under the authority of which the island was first colonised in 1719, and later the British monarchy, as a Crown colony. On 27 October 1979, the country gained independence from the United Kingdom, retaining the then reigning monarch, Elizabeth II, as monarch of the newly created monarchy of Saint Vincent and the Grenadines. The monarch is represented in the country by the Governor-General of Vincent and the Grenadines, currently Dame Susan Dougan.

==== British overseas territories ====
The United Kingdom possesses a number of overseas territories in the Americas, for whom King Charles III is monarch. In North America are Anguilla, Bermuda, the British Virgin Islands, the Cayman Islands, Montserrat, and the Turks and Caicos Islands, while the Falkland Islands, and South Georgia and the South Sandwich Islands are located in South America. The Caribbean islands were colonised under the authority or the direct instruction of a number of European monarchs, mostly English, Dutch, or Spanish, throughout the first half of the 17th century. By 1681, however, when the Turks and Caicos Islands were settled by Britons, all of the above-mentioned islands were under the control of Charles II of England, Scotland, and Ireland. Colonies were merged and split through various reorganizations of the Crown's Caribbean regions, until 19 December 1980, the date that Anguilla became a British Crown territory in its own right. The monarch is represented in these jurisdictions by: the Governor of Anguilla, Dileeni Daniel-Selvaratnam; the Governor of Bermuda, Rena Lalgie; the Governor of the British Virgin Islands, John Rankin; the Governor of the Cayman Islands, Martyn Roper; the Governor of Montserrat, Harriet Cross; and the Governor of the Turks and Caicos Islands, Nigel Dakin.

The Falkland Islands, off the south coast of Argentina, were simultaneously claimed for Louis XV of France, in 1764, and George III of the United Kingdom, in 1765, though the French colony was ceded to Charles III of Spain in 1767. By 1833, however, the islands were under full British control. The South Georgia and South Sandwich Islands were discovered by Captain James Cook for George III in January 1775, and from 1843 were governed by the British Crown-in-Council through the Falkland Islands, an arrangement that stood until the South Georgia and South Sandwich Islands were incorporated as a distinct British overseas territory in 1985. The monarch is represented in these regions by Alison Blake, who is both the Governor of the Falkland Islands and the Commissioner for South Georgia and the South Sandwich Islands.

=== Danish monarchy ===
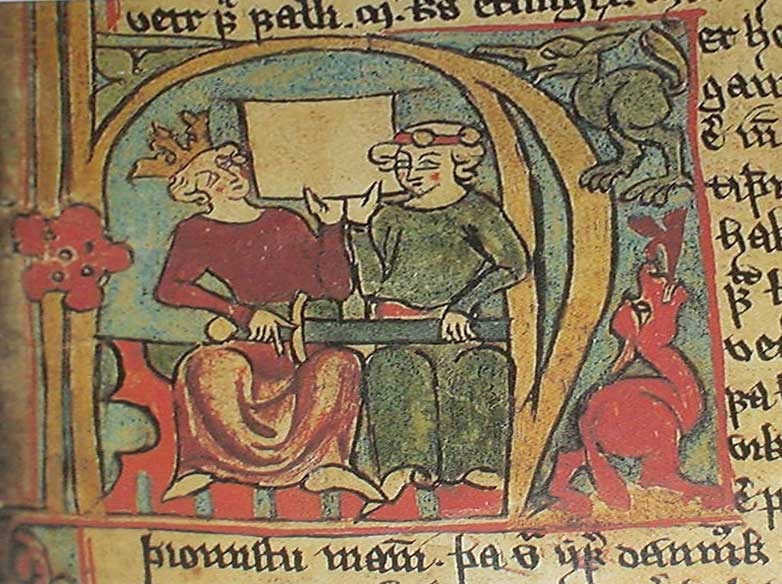
Hákon, King of Norway (seated on the left) took possession of Greenland in 1261.

Greenland is one of the three constituent countries of the Kingdom of Denmark, with Frederik X as the reigning sovereign. The territory first came under monarchical rule in 1261 under the King of Norway; by 1380, Norway had entered into a personal union with the Kingdom of Denmark, which became more entrenched with the union of the kingdoms into Denmark–Norway in 1536. After the dissolution of this arrangement in 1814, Greenland remained a Danish colony, and, after its role in World War II, was granted its special status within the Kingdom of Denmark in 1953. The monarch is represented in the territory by the Rigsombudsmand (High Commissioner), Mikaela Engell.

=== Dutch monarchy ===
Aruba, Curaçao and Sint Maarten are constituent countries of the Kingdom of the Netherlands and thus have King Willem-Alexander as their sovereign, as do the islands of the Caribbean Netherlands. Aruba was first settled under the authority of the Spanish Crown circa 1499, but was acquired by the Dutch in 1634, under whose control the island has remained, save for an interval between 1805 and 1816, when Aruba was captured by the Royal Navy of King George III. The former Netherlands Antilles were originally discovered by explorers sent in the 1490s by the King of Spain, but were eventually conquered by the Dutch West India Company in the 17th century, whereafter the islands remained under the control of the Dutch Crown as colonial territories. The Netherlands Antilles achieved the status of an autonomous country within the Kingdom of the Netherlands in 1954, from which Aruba was split in 1986 as a separate constituent country of the larger kingdom. The former Netherlands Antilles was dissolved in 2010; two of its islands became constituent countries in their own right (Curaçao and Sint Maarten), while the other three became integral parts of the Netherlands (i.e., the Caribbean Netherlands). The monarch is represented in the constituent countries by the Governor of Aruba, Alfonso Boekhoudt, the Governor of Curaçao, Frits Goedgedrag, and the Governor of Sint Maarten, Eugene Holiday.

== Succession laws ==
Succession in the American Commonwealth realms, as well as the British overseas territories in the region, has generally followed the rules of the succession to the British throne. Succession was via male-preference cognatic primogeniture before 2011. By these rules, succession passed first to the monarch's sons, in order of birth, and, subsequently, to daughters, again in order of birth. The succession laws were changed between 2011 and 2015, following the Perth Agreement, in which the realms agreed succession would be by absolute primogeniture for those born after 28 October 2011, whereby the eldest child inherits the throne, regardless of gender. The change was implemented only once the necessary legal processes were completed in each Commonwealth realm.

Succession to the Danish throne was via male-preference primogeniture from 1953 to 2009, and by absolute primogeniture since 2009.

Succession to the Dutch throne was via male-preference primogeniture from 1887 to 1983, and has been by absolute primogeniture since 1983.

== Former monarchies ==
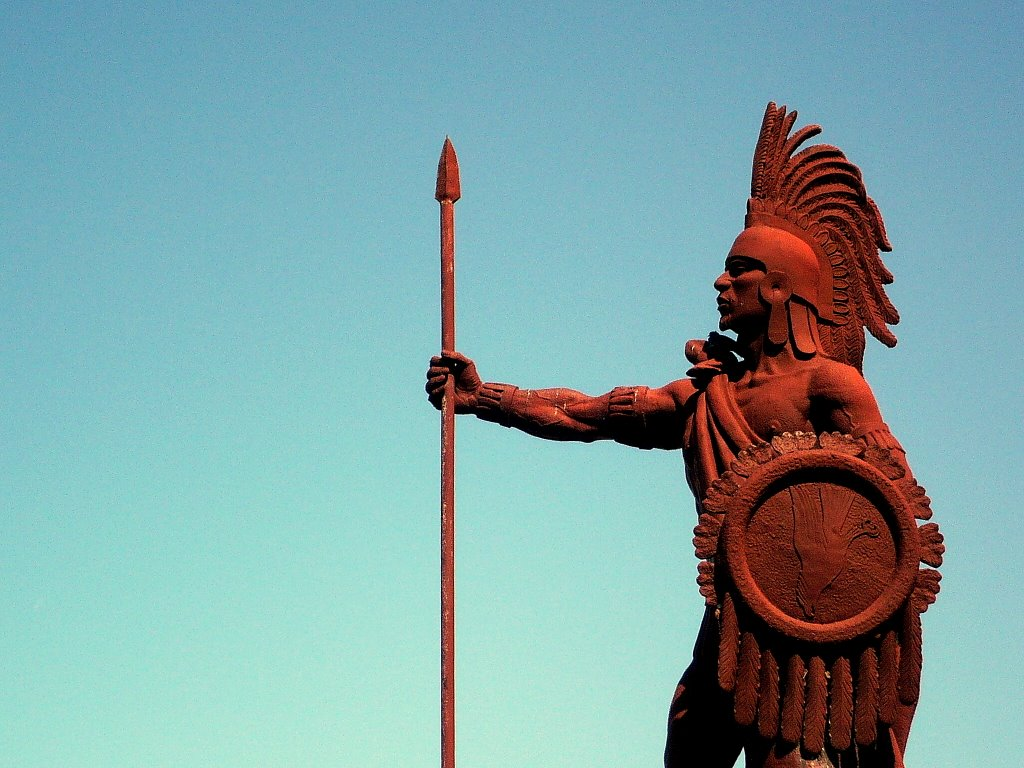
The monument to Cuauhtémoc, the last sovereign king of the Aztec Empire

Much about the nature of the pre-Columbian cultures of the Americas is lost and unknown, as writings and inscriptions generally either disintegrated or was never made. It is probable that at least some of these cultures had monarchies of some form, but the details will likely never be known. Better records exist of the state of these cultures in the 15th and 16th centuries during the initial European colonization of the Americas, so something is known of the native Aztec and Inca governments, for example. The initial European colonies tended to follow the government of their home countries, with new American administrations overseen by delegated viceroys, although eventually many of these colonies gained independence. Crowns that once held or claim territory in the Americas include the Spanish, Portuguese, French, Swedish, and Russian, and even Baltic Courland, Holy Roman, Prussian and Norwegian.

=== Aztec ===
The Aztec Empire existed in the central Mexican region between c. 1325 and 1521, and was formed by the triple alliance of the tlatoque (the Nahuatl term for "speaker", also translated in English as "king") of three city-states: Tlacopan, Texcoco, and the capital of the empire, Tenochtitlan. While the lineage of Tenochtitlan's kings continued after the city's fall to the Spanish on 13 August 1521, they reigned as puppet rulers of the King of Spain until the death of the last dynastic tlatoani, Luis de Santa María Nanacacipactzin, on 27 December 1565.

=== Barbados ===
The monarchy of Barbados had its roots in the English monarchy, under the authority of which the island was claimed in 1625 and colonised in 1627, and later the British monarchy. By the 18th century, Barbados became one of the main seats of the British Crown's authority in the British West Indies, and then, after an attempt in 1958 at a federation with other West Indian colonies, continued as a self-governing colony until, on 30 November 1966, the country gained independence from the United Kingdom, retaining the then reigning monarch, Elizabeth II, as monarch of the newly formed monarchy of Barbados. The monarch was represented in the country by the governor-general of Barbados.

In 1966, Elizabeth's cousin, Prince Edward, Duke of Kent, opened the second session of the first parliament of the newly established country, before the Queen herself, along with Prince Philip, Duke of Edinburgh, toured Barbados. Elizabeth returned for her Silver Jubilee in 1977, and again in 1989, to mark the 350th anniversary of the establishment of the Barbadian Parliament.

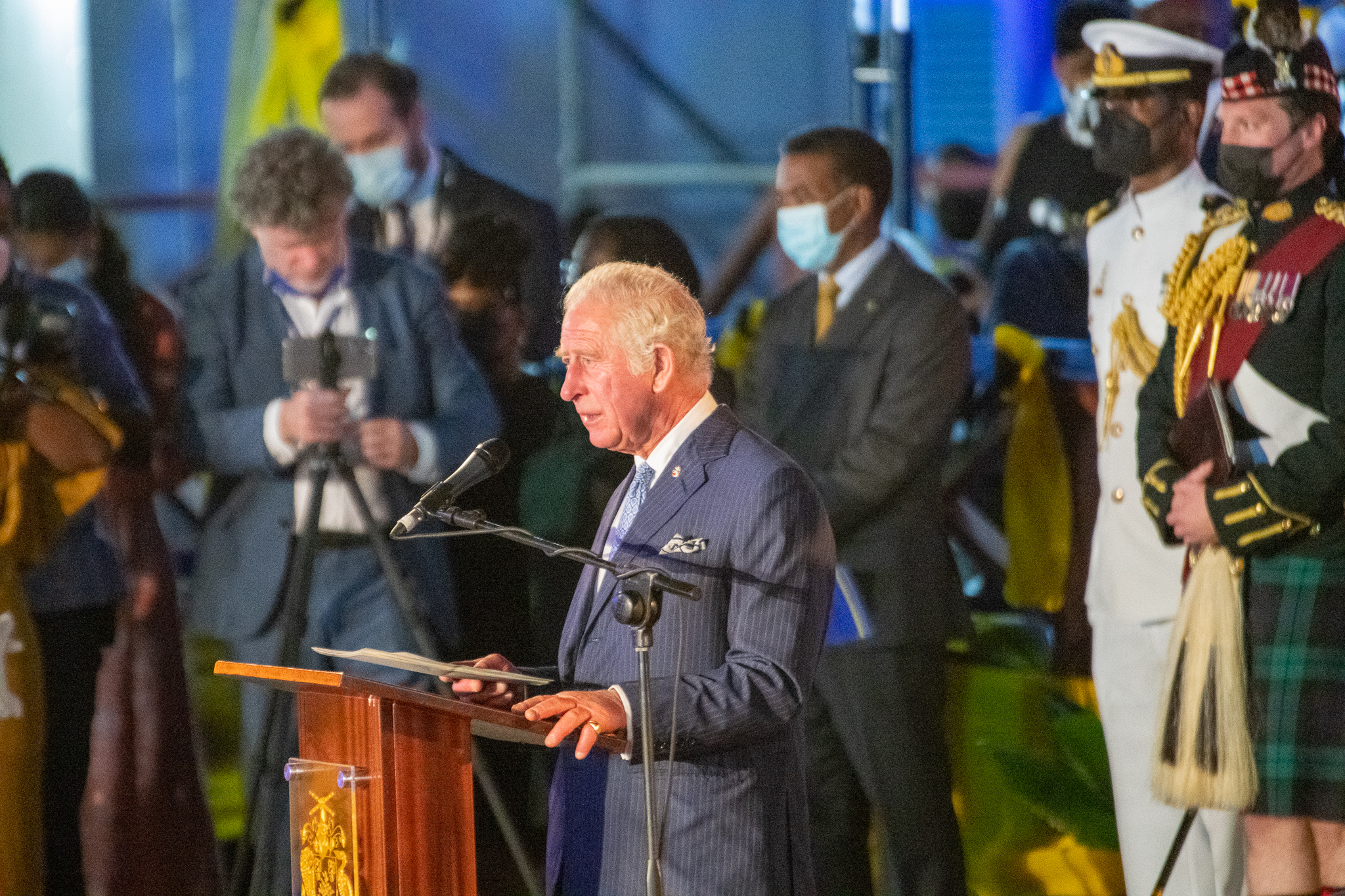
Prince Charles at the ceremony marking the end of the Barbadian monarchy and establishment of a republic, in Bridgetown, Barbados, 30 November 2021

Former Prime Minister Owen Arthur called for a referendum on Barbados becoming a republic to be held in 2005, though, the vote was then pushed back to "at least 2006" in order to speed up Barbados' integration in the CARICOM Single Market and Economy. It was announced on 26 November 2007 that the referendum would be held in 2008, together with the general election that year. The vote was, however, postponed again, due to administrative concerns. On 20 September 2021, just over a full year after the announcement for the transition was made, the Constitution (Amendment) (No. 2) Bill, 2021, was introduced to the Parliament of Barbados. Passed on 6 October, the Bill made amendments to the constitution of Barbados, introducing the office of the president to replace the Barbadian monarch as head of state. The next week, on 12 October 2021, incumbent Governor-General of Barbados Dame Sandra Mason was jointly nominated by the Prime Minister and Leader of the Opposition as the sole candidate for the first president of Barbados and was subsequently indirectly elected on 20 October. Mason took office on 30 November 2021.

=== Brazil ===
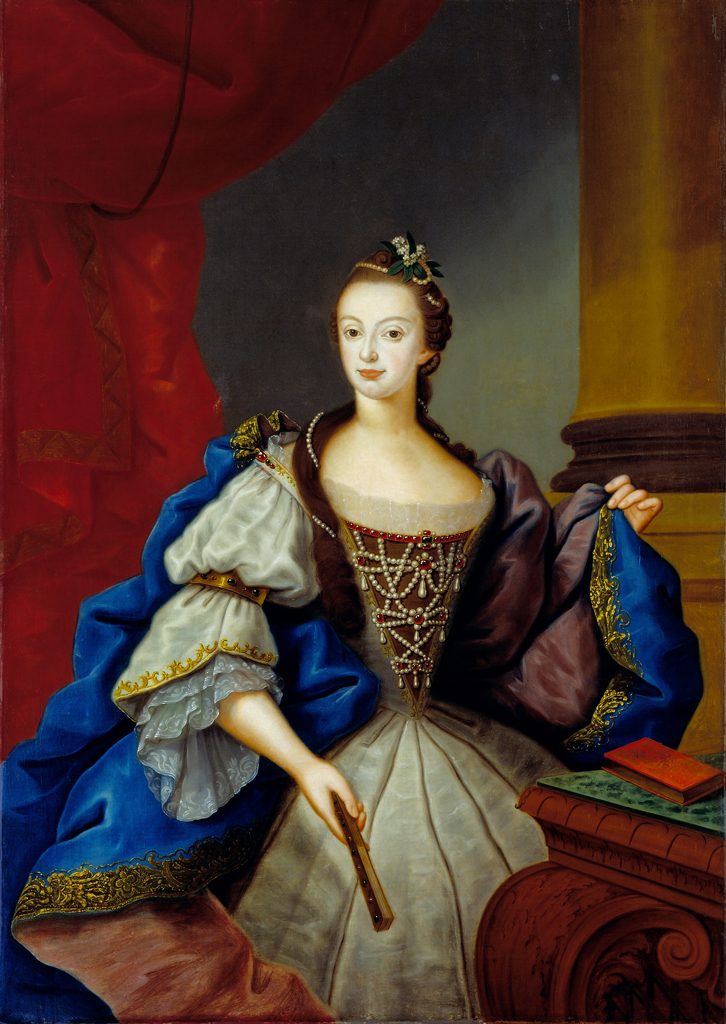
Maria I of Portugal became the first Queen of Brazil in 1815 with the creation of the United Kingdom of Portugal, Brazil and the Algarves.

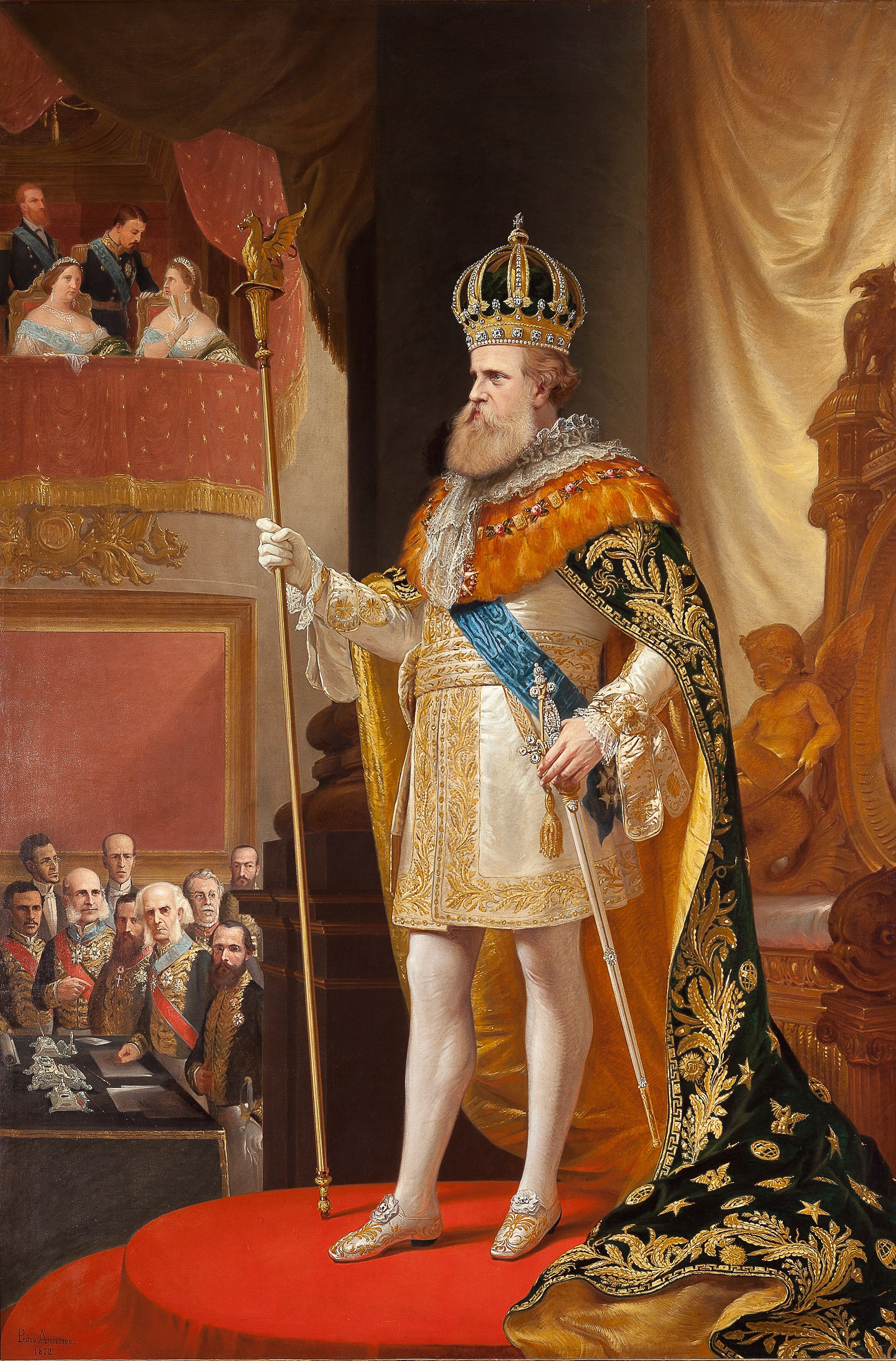
Emperor Pedro II of Brazil

Brazil was created as a kingdom on 16 December 1815, when Prince João, Prince of Brazil, who was then acting as regent for his ailing mother, Queen Maria, elevated the colony to a constituent country of the United Kingdom of Portugal, Brazil and the Algarves. While the royal court was still based in Rio de Janeiro, João ascended as king of the united kingdom the following year, and returned to Portugal in 1821, leaving his son, Prince Pedro, Prince Royal, as his regent in the Kingdom of Brazil. In September of that same year, the Portuguese parliament threatened to diminish Brazil back to the status of a colony, dismantle all the royal agencies in Rio de Janeiro, and demanded Pedro return to Lisbon. The Prince, however, feared these moves would trigger separatist movements and refused to comply; instead, at the urging of his father, he declared Brazil an independent Nation on 7 September 1822, leading to the formation of the Empire of Brazil, a constitutional monarchy.

Prince Pedro became the first Emperor of Brazil on 12 October 1822, with the title of Pedro I (on that date, he was formally offered the Throne of the newly created Empire, accepted it, and was acclaimed as monarch), and his coronation took place on 1 December 1822. After Pedro abdicated the throne on 7 April 1831, the Brazilian empire saw only one additional monarch: Pedro II, who reigned for 58 years before a coup d'état overthrew the monarchy on 15 November 1889. There are two pretenders to the defunct Brazilian throne: Bertrand of Orléans-Braganza, head of the Vassouras branch of the Brazilian Imperial Family, and, according to legitimist claims, de jure Emperor of Brazil; and Prince Pedro Carlos of Orléans-Braganza, head of the Petrópolis line of the Brazilian Imperial Family, and heir to the Brazilian throne according to royalists.

=== Chorotega ===
The Chorotegas spoke the extinct Mangue language and are distributed between Honduras, Nicaragua, Costa Rica, and formerly El Salvador. Between 500 and 700 AD, the Chorotega migrated from central and southern Mexico to parts of Honduras and Costa Rica, but primarily to Nicaragua because of the fertile land surrounding Lakes Nicaragua and Managua that was suitable for agriculture. In the 16th century they established two notable indigenous kingdoms, namely Chorotega (or Old Chorotega) and Orotina. The Chorotegas often fought wars against the Huetars, which led to their eventual enslavement and gradual disappearance as a people. Today the Chorotega community appears to have died out or lost its identity over the centuries following Spanish subjugation, with only one hacienda eventually coming to bear its name.

=== Haiti ===
The entire island of Hispaniola was first claimed on 5 December 1492, by Christopher Columbus, for Queen Isabella, and the first Viceroy of the Americas was established along with a number of colonies throughout the Island. With the later discovery of Mexico and Peru many of the early settlers left for the mainland, but some twelve cities and a hundred thousand souls remained, mainly in the Eastern part of the Island. Through the Treaty of Riswick in 1697, King Louis XIV received the western third of the Island from Spain as retribution and formalized the first French pirate settlement in existence since the mid-1600s, with the colony administered by a governor-general representing the French crown, an arrangement that stood until the French Revolution toppled the monarchy of France on 21 September 1792. Though the French government retained control over the region of Saint-Domingue, on 22 September 1804, Jean-Jacques Dessalines, who had served as Governor-General of Saint-Domingue since 30 November 1803, declared himself as head of an independent Empire of Haiti, with his coronation as Emperor Jacques I taking place on 6 October that year. After his assassination on 17 October 1806, the country was split in half, the northern portion eventually becoming the Kingdom of Haiti on 28 March 1811, with Henri Christophe installed as King Henri I. When King Henri committed suicide on 8 October 1820, and his son, Jacques-Victor Henry, Prince Royal of Haiti, was murdered by revolutionaries ten days later, the kingdom was merged into the southern Republic of Haiti, of which Faustin Soulouque was elected president on 2 March 1847. Two years later, on 26 August 1849, the Haitian national assembly declared the president as Emperor Faustin I, thereby re-establishing the Empire of Haiti. But this monarchical reincarnation was to be short lived as well, as a revolution broke out in the empire in 1858, resulting in Faustin abdicating the throne on 18 January 1859.

=== Huetar ===
The Huetares, otherwise known as the Pacacuas, were the most powerful and best-organized indigenous nation in Costa Rica upon the arrival of the Spaniards. During the 16th century, various chieftains dominated from the Costa Rican Atlantic coast to the Atlantic Slope. The Spanish chronicles mention a myriad of towns and the kings that ruled them, among them the Garabito Empire, on the Central Atlantic Slope and the Tárcoles River basin, to the Virilla River and the Cordillera Central; the Kingdom of Pacaca, in the current canton of Mora; and the Eastern Huetar Kingdom, in the current Guarco Valley, in the Cartago Province, to the plains of the Central Caribbean and Chirripó. Other important native kingdoms of the region included Toyopán, which covered the current cantons of Vázquez de Coronado and Tibás, in the San José Province, and San Isidro and Santo Domingo, in the Heredia Province; and the Western Huetar Kingdom, which had strong connections to two aforementioned kingdoms: it vassalized Toyopán and was ruled by King Garabito of the Garabito Empire. Their culture belonged to the Intermediate Area, and it stood out mainly for their works in stone, such as metates, sculptures, tables and ceremonial altars; and the non-practice of anthropophagy or cannibalism. A small Huetar group has survived to modern times, composed of approximately 1000 individuals, and are at the top of the Quitirrisí Indigenous Reserve.

=== Inca ===
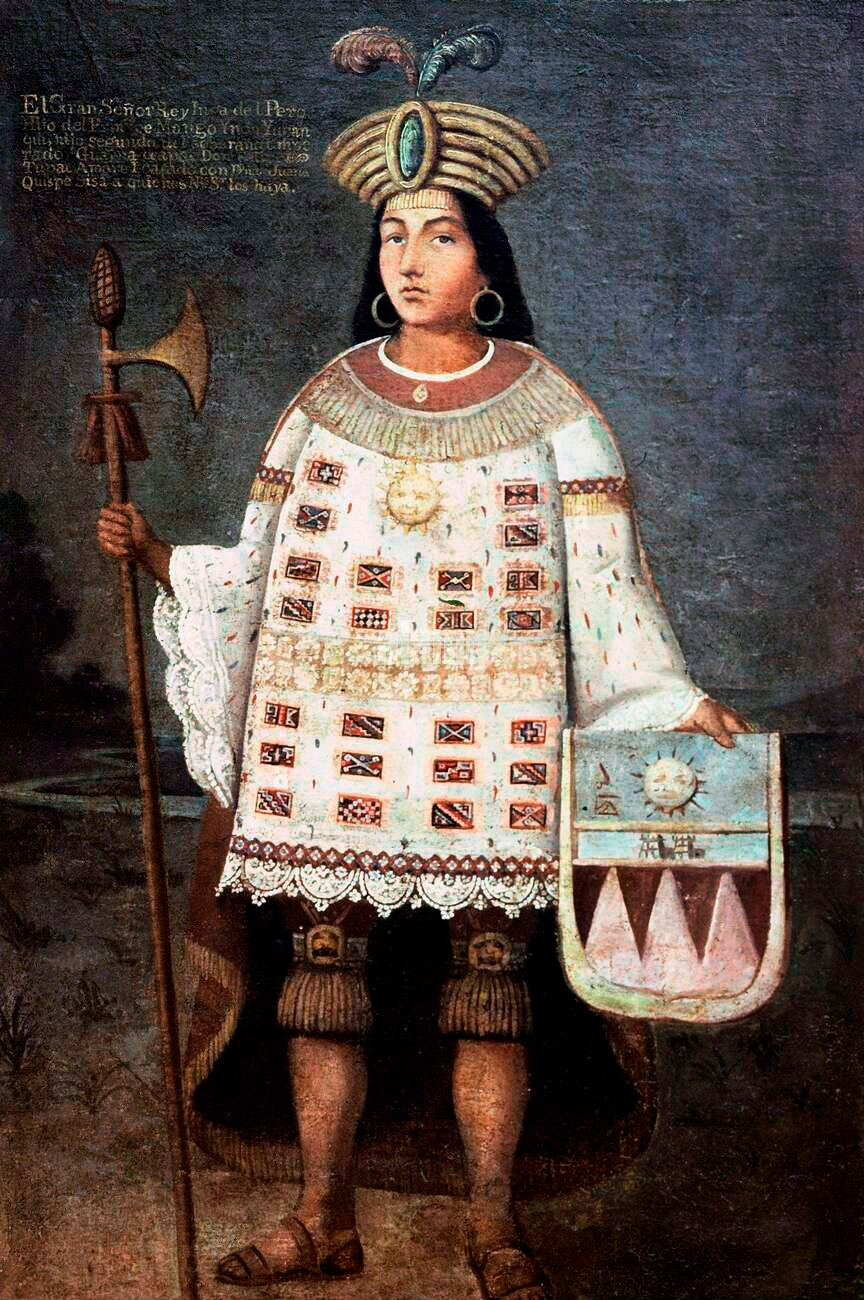
Túpac Amaru, the last Sapa Inca of the Neo-Inca State in Vilcabamba

The Inca Empire spread across the north western parts of South America between 1438 and 1533, ruled over by a monarch addressed as the Sapa Inca, Sapa, or Apu. The Inca civilization emerged in the Kingdom of Cusco, and expanded to become the Ttahuantin-suyu, or "land of the four sections", each ruled by a governor or viceroy called Apu-cuna, under the leadership of the central Sapa Inca. The Inca Empire eventually fell to the Spanish in 1533, when the last Sapa Inca of the empire, Atahualpa, was captured and executed on 29 August. The conquerors installed other Sapa Inca beginning with Atahualpa's brother, Túpac Huallpa. Manco Inca Yupanqui, originally also a puppet Inca Emperor installed by the Spaniards, rebelled and founded the small independent Neo-Inca State in Vilcabamba, and the line continued until the death of Túpac Amaru in 1572.

=== Maya ===
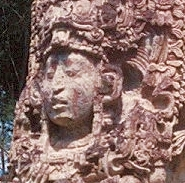
Stele representing King Uaxaclajuun Ub'aah K'awiil of Copan

The Maya civilization was on the Yucatán Peninsula and into the isthmian portion of North America, and the northern portion of Central America (Guatemala, Belize, El Salvador and Honduras) comprised a number of ajawil, ajawlel, or ajawlil – hierarchical polities headed by an hereditary ruler known as a k’uhul ajaw "divine lord" (the Classic Maya term for a sovereign leader).

Despite constant warfare and shifts in regional power, most Maya kingdoms remained a part of the region's landscape, even following subordination to hegemonic rulers through conquest or dynastic union. Nonetheless, the Maya civilization began its decline in the 8th and 9th centuries, and by the time of the arrival of the Spanish, only a few kingdoms remained, such as the Peten Itza kingdom, Mam, Kaqchikel, and the K'iche' Kingdom of Q'umarkaj. On 13 March 1697, the last Maya king—Kan Ek’, of the Itza Maya—was defeated at the Itza capital Nojpetén by the forces of King Philip IV of Spain.

=== Mexico ===
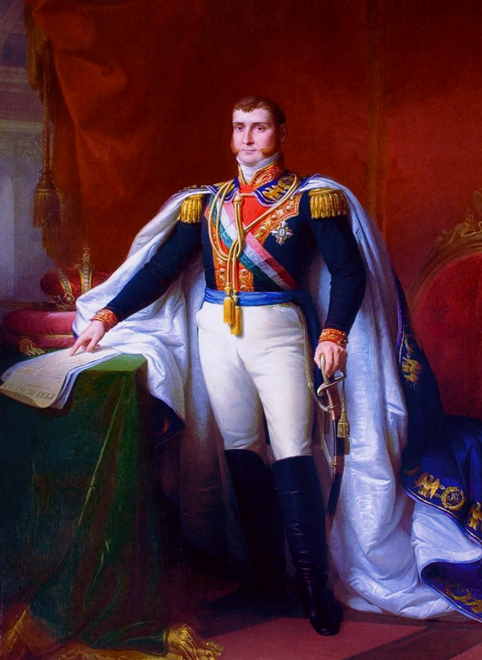
Emperor Agustin I of Mexico

With the victory of the Mexicans over the Spanish imperial army in 1821, the Viceroyalty of New Spain came to a conclusion. The newly independent Mexican Congress still desired that King Ferdinand VII, or another member of the House of Bourbon, agree to be installed as Emperor of Mexico, thereby forming a type of personal union with Spain. The Spanish monarchy, however, refused to recognise the new state, and decreed that it would allow no other European prince to take the throne of Mexico. Thus, the Mexican Agustín de Iturbide was crowned as Augustine I on 19 May 1822, with an official decree of confirmation issued two days following. Only a few months later, Augustine dissolved a factious congress, thereby prompting an enraged Antonio López de Santa Anna to mount a coup, which led to the declaration of a republic on 1 December 1822. In order to end the unrest, Augustine abdicated on 19 March 1823 and left the country, and the Mexican monarchy was abolished. After hearing that the situation in Mexico had only grown worse since his abdication, Iturbide returned from England on 11 May 1824, but was detained upon setting foot in Mexico and, without trial, was executed.

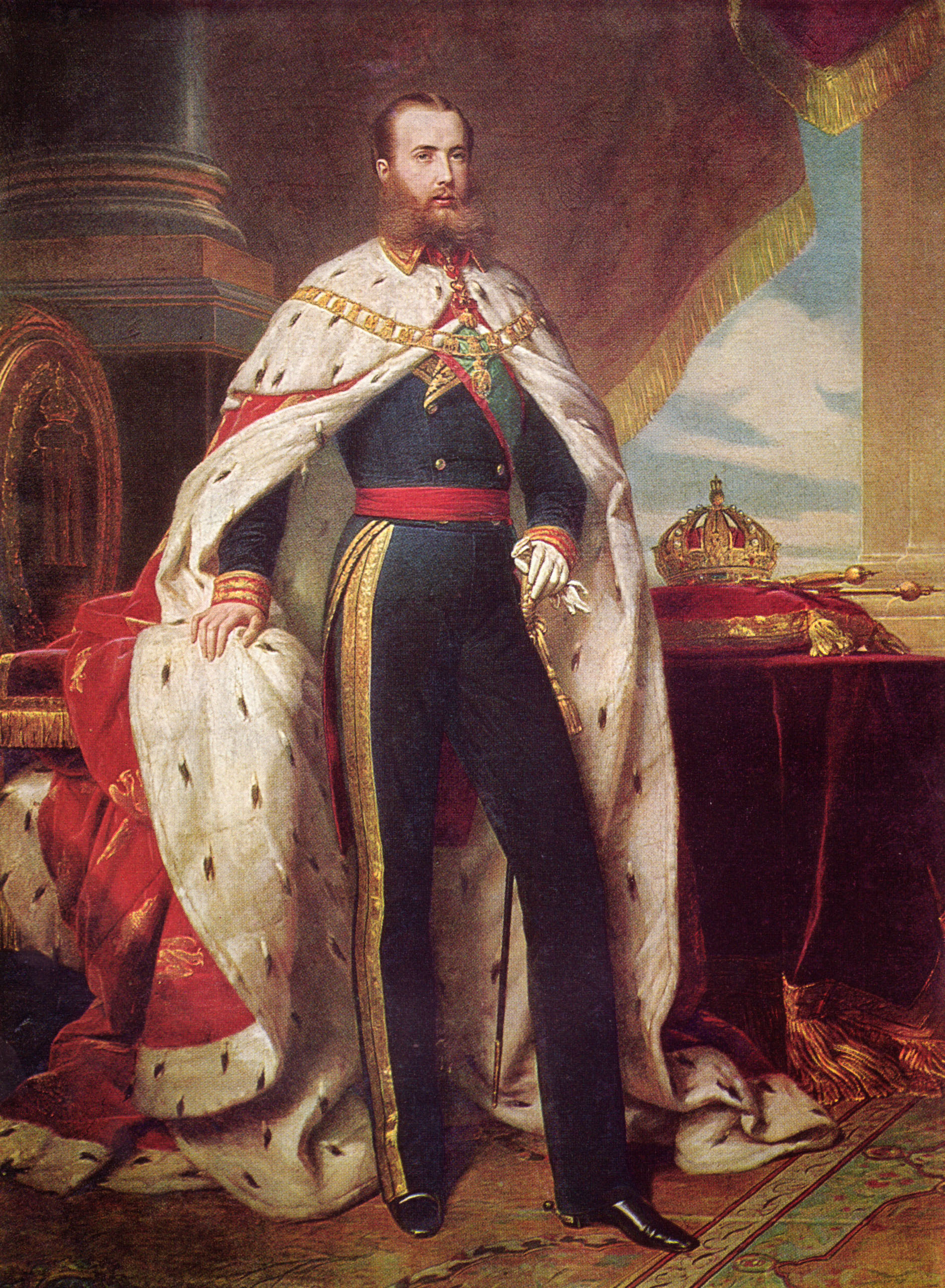
Portrait of Maximilian I of Mexico, by Franz Xaver Winterhalter

In 1861, Benito Juárez, the republican President of Mexico, suspended all repayments on Mexico's foreign debts (save those owed to the United States), leading France, the United Kingdom, and Spain to send a joint expeditionary force that took Veracruz in December 1861. Juárez's government then agreed to repay the debts, after which British and Spanish troops withdrew, but Emperor Napoleon III of France and Mexican monarchists used the opportunity to overthrow the republic and install a Mexican monarch friendly to the interests of France and the Mexican nobility.

Archduke Maximilian of Austria, brother of the Emperor of Austria, and descendant of the prior Habsburg rulers of Mexico as New Spain, was elected Emperor Maximilian I of Mexico by the Assembly of Notables in Mexico City, thereby re-establishing the Mexican monarchy.

The new Mexican emperor ultimately did not bow to Napoleon's wishes, leading the latter to withdraw the majority of his influence from Mexico. Regardless, Maximilian was still viewed as a French puppet by the liberals. As well, at the end of the American Civil War, US troops moved to the Mexico-US border as part of a planned invasion, seeing the establishment of the Second Mexican Empire as an infringement on their Monroe Doctrine, even though it was a Mexican scheme and was considered an endemic Mexican monarchy. Backed by the Americans, ex-president Juárez mobilised to retake power, and defeated Maximilian at Querétaro on 15 May 1867. The Emperor was arraigned before a military tribunal, sentenced to death, and executed at the Cerro de las Campanas on 19 June 1867.

=== Kingdom of Mosquitia ===
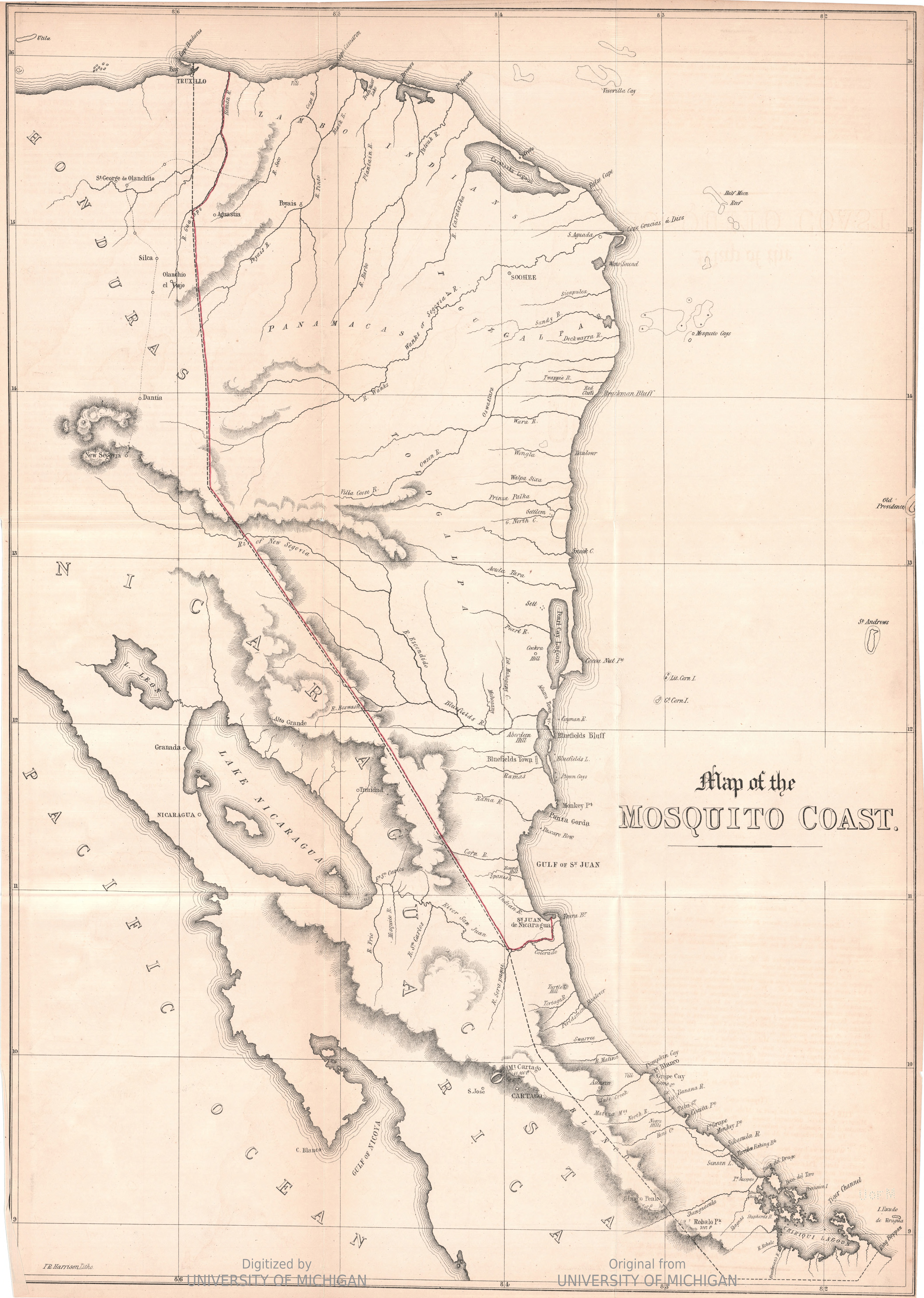
Map of the Kingdom of Mosquitia

The Kingdom of Mosquitia was along the western shore of the Caribbean Sea in Central America, traditionally described as extending from Cape Camarón to the River Chagres.

The Miskitu, Pech, Rama, Garifuna, Mayagna and later Creole people of Central America who inhabited the territory were governed by the authority of the Mosquitian Monarchy. While the kings had authority over the entire territory; there were other important leaders known as "generals," "governors," and "admirals," who controlled different regions within the Kingdom.

The Kingdom of Mosquitia was similar to that of the Hawaiian kinship system. Many generals tried to become kings, but only Peter, the first known historically, became King Regent, following the death of his brother King Jeremy. All Miskitu kings, generals, governors and Admirals were close relatives who controlled the kingship for more than 270 years.

According to the oral tradition of the Miskitus, centuries ago, a group of people who were led by their warrior leader Miskut, emigrated from northern South America, traveled the Caribbean coast and settled on the continent, in a place where a river, a lagoon and the sea converged. They called this site Sitawala, the river would later be called Wangki (Coco River), and the lagoon Kip Almuk (Old Cape). The villagers called themselves Miskut kiampka (Miskut family) or Miskut uplika nani (people of Miskut).

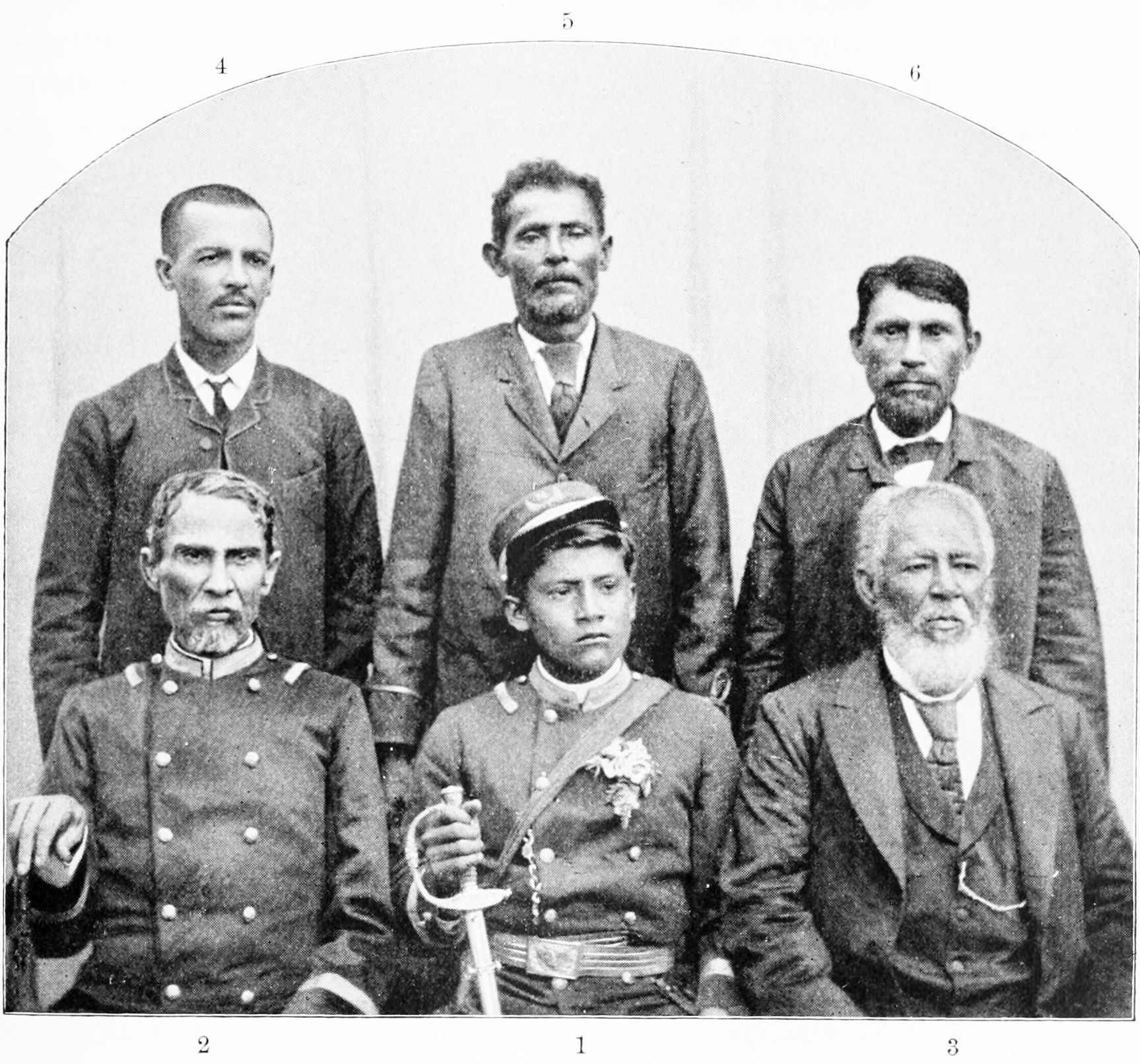
The Miskitu chief Robert and executive council

Contacts with pirates (French, Dutch and British) and Africans (seeking refuge to escape slavery) began in the 17th century. In 1629, English Puritans established on Providence Island, what they called New Westminster, the Providence Company. From dealing with British merchants and settlers, the Miskitu people obtain non-traditional products and firearms, which became a new cultural needs. This was also the time when the Kingdom start to gain its popularity.

The Kingdom of Mosquitia became a stronger force against the Spanish when the Miskitu King Edward I, signed a Treaty of Friendship and Alliance with King George II of Great Britain, accepting military protection and the English common law except when English law was in conflict with existing Miskitu customs, culture and traditions.

At the cessation of the American Revolutionary War, King George III, via the Convention of London, also known as the Anglo-Spanish Convention, was an agreement negotiated between the Kingdom of Great Britain and the Kingdom of Spain concerning the status of British settlements within the territory of Central America. It was signed on 14 July 1786. Britain agreed to evacuate all British settlements from Mosquitia. In exchange, Spain agreed to expand the territory available to British loggers on the Yucatán Peninsula, and allowed them to cut mahogany and other hardwoods. Over the opposition of Mosquitia settler, the agreement was implemented, and the British evacuated more than 2,000 people. Most of them went to Belize, but others were relocated to Jamaica, Grand Cayman and Roatan.

However, Great Britain continued their relationship with the Mosquitian Kingdom and its government, whereby they interfered for the next 150 years into Moskitia international affairs at the expense of the sovereignty of the Mosquitian Kingdom. Through the act of what Great Britain called "indirect rule," they concluded the signing of the Clayton-Bulwer Treaty of 1850 with the United States. Base on the terms of the treaty, neither Great Britain or the United States would ever "occupy, or fortify, or colonize, or assume or exercise any dominion over Nicaragua, Costa Rica, the Mosquito Coast or any part of Central America", nor make use of any protectorate or alliance, present or future. This meant giving King George IV (George Augustus Frederic) the full control of his Kingdom and the recognition of the Mosquitian Kingdom as a sovereign nation. However, in 1860, Great Britain, without any International right, entertained the Treaty of Managua, in which Great Britain claim to recognize Mosquitia as being part of the Nicaraguan territory. This treaty however, reserved, on the basis of historical rights, a self governing enclave known as the Mosquito Reserve for the people, citing earlier treaty arrangements and historical circumstances. Subsequently, the king was also forced to change his title to chief.

After the chief and the people of the Mosquito Reserve enjoyed 34 years of autonomy, the Nicaraguan government violated the terms of the 1860 Treaty of Managua, and in 1894, sent army troops to the Mosquito Reserve in order to incorporate the region to the rest of the country. In 1905, the Harrison-Altamirano Treaty was signed between Nicaragua and Great Britain which ended the Mosquito Reserve, it's legal and hereditary government, and its Autonomy Statute.

During this same historical time, in 1957, the Hereditary Matriarch, Josephenie Hendy Hebbert Twaska, tried to regain the independence of Mosquitia. However, after the execution of some of her family members, in 1960, she was given the option to be exiled permanently or face death or imprisonment. She moved to Costa Rica and now lives the United States where she is still trying to regain Independence for her people.

Mosquitia regained its Autonomy Statute after three years of war between the FSLN government and a group of alliance between Indigenous and Afro-descendant people of the Mosquitia, when in 1984, the government proposed negotiations to end the war. The first talks of these negotiations were carried out with the Miskitu leader, Brooklyn Rivera. And on 30 October 1987 the Autonomy Statute was published. The Mosquitian Monarchy have still yet to be restored, still many Miskitu people and others still recognize the Miskitu Royal family.

=== Taíno ===
The Taínos were an indigenous civilization spread across those islands today lying within the Bahamas, Greater Antilles, and the northern Lesser Antilles. These regions were divided into kingdoms (the island of Hispaniola alone was segmented into five kingdoms), which were themselves sometimes sub-divided into provinces. Each kingdom was led by a cacique, or "chieftain", who was advised in his exercise of royal power by a council of priests/healers known as bohiques. The line of succession, however, was matrilineal, whereby if there was no male heir to become cacigue, the title would pass to the eldest child, whether son or daughter, of the deceased's sister. After battling for centuries with the Carib, the Taíno empire finally succumbed to disease and genocide brought by the Spanish colonisers.

=== Colonial monarchies ===
==== Courland ====
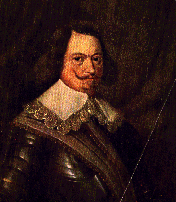
Jacob Kettler, Duke of Courland and Semigallia, tried to establish a colony in the Americas

After a number of failed attempts at colonising Tobago, Duke Jacob Kettler of Courland and Semigallia, sent one more ship to the island, which landed there on 20 May 1654, carrying soldiers and colonists, who named the island New Courland. At approximately the same time, Dutch colonies were established at other locations on the island, and eventually outgrew those of the Duchy of Courland in population. When the Duke was captured by Swedish forces in 1658, Dutch settlers overtook the Courland colonies, forcing the Governor to surrender. After a return of the territory to Courland through the 1660 Treaty of Oliwa, a number of attempts were made by the next Duke of Courland (Friedrich Casimir Kettler) at re-colonisation, but these met with failure, and he sold New Courland in 1689.

==== France ====
After King Francis I commissioned Jacques Cartier to search out an eastern route to Asia, the settlement of Port Royal was founded on 27 July 1605 in what was Acadia, today is called Annapolis Royal, Nova Scotia. From there, the French Crown's empire in the Americas grew to include areas of land surrounding the Great Lakes and down the Mississippi River, as well as islands in the Caribbean, and the north eastern shore of South America; the Viceroyalty of New France was eventually made into a royal province of France in 1663 by King Louis XIV. Some regions were lost to the Spanish or British Crowns through conflict and treaties, and those that were still possessions of the French king on 21 December 1792 came under republican rule when the French monarchy was abolished on that day. Upon several restorations of the monarchy, the royal presence in the Americas ended with the collapse of the Second French Empire under Napoleon III in 1870.

==== Russia ====
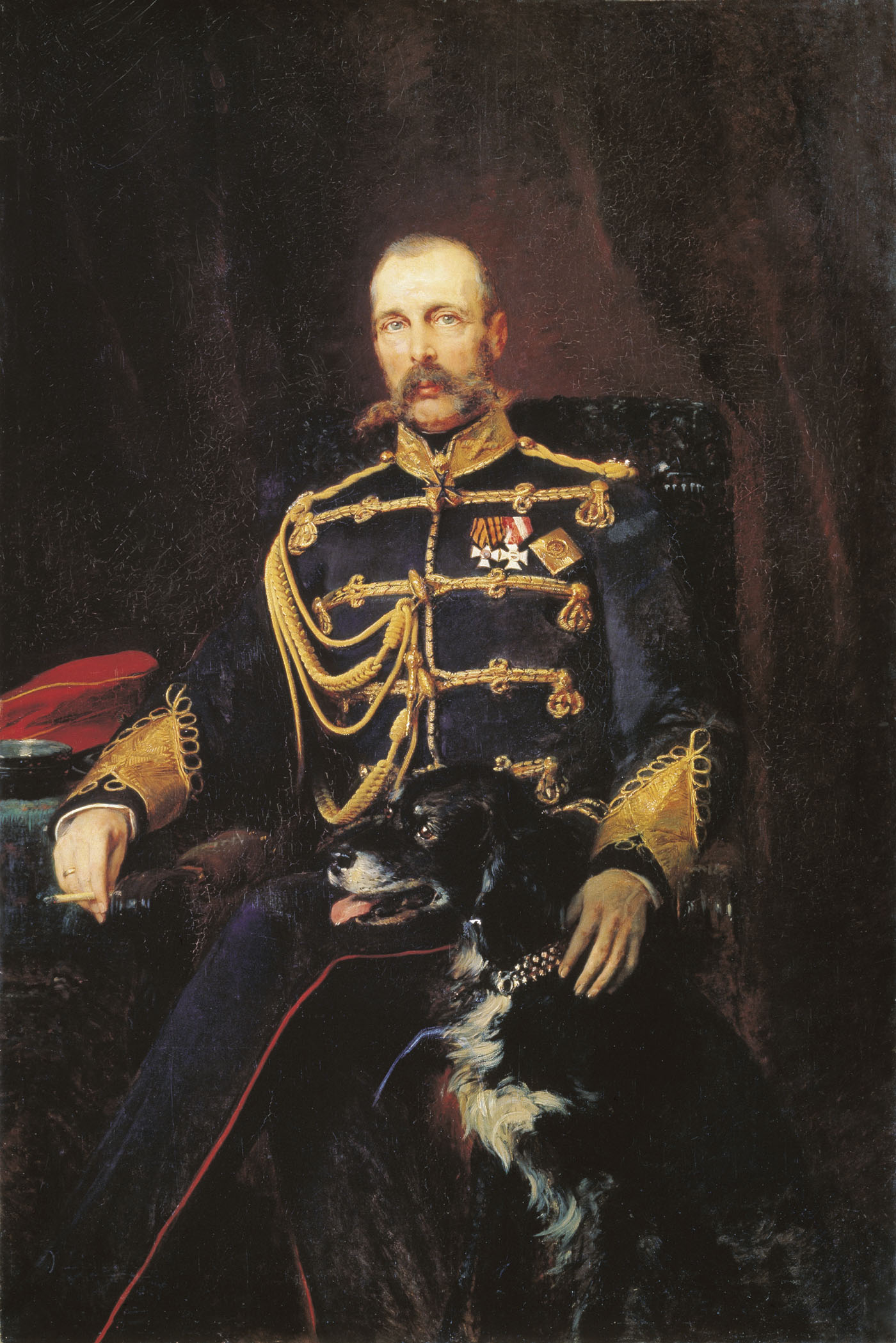
Tsar Alexander II, Emperor of Russia, who sold Alaska to the United States of America in 1867

The first permanent Russian settlements in what is today the US state of Alaska were set down in the 1790s, forming Russian Alaska, after Tsar Peter I called for expeditions across the Bering Strait in 1725, with the region administered by the head of the Russian-American Company as the Emperor's representative. Another Russian outpost, Fort Ross, was established in 1812 in what is now California. The colonies, however, were never profitable enough to maintain Russian interest in the area, with the population only ever reaching a maximum of 700. Fort Ross was sold in 1841, and in 1867, a deal was brokered whereby Tsar Alexander II sold his Alaskan territory to the United States of America for $7,200,000, and the official transfer took place on 30 October that year.

==== Portugal ====
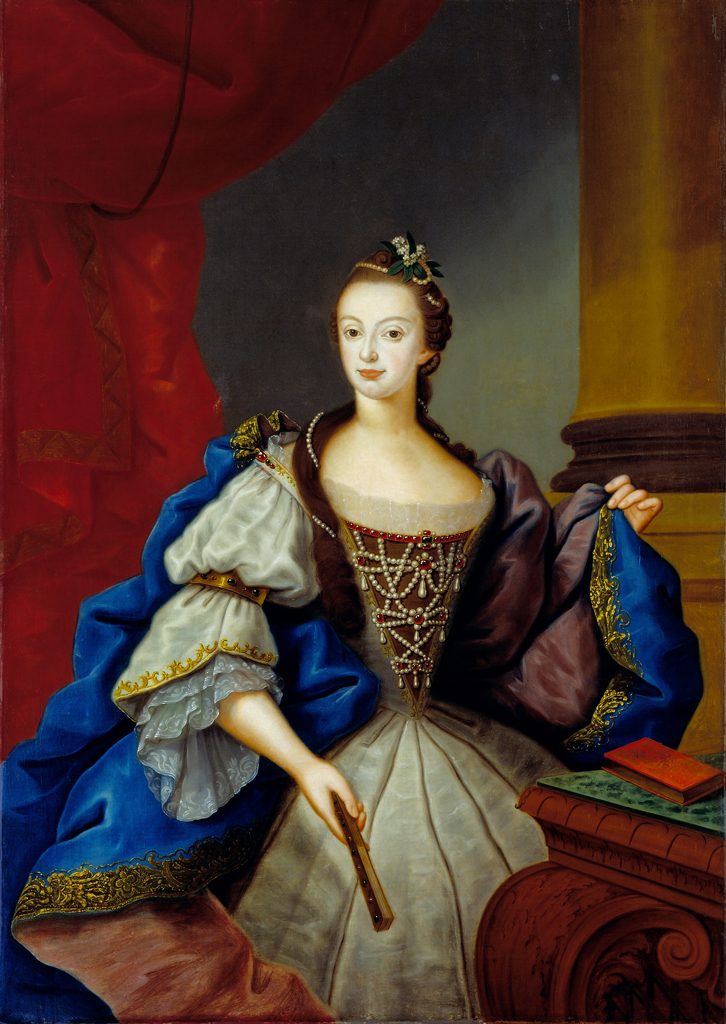
Queen Maria I of Portugal, first Queen of Brazil

The United Kingdom of Portugal, Brazil and the Algarves came into being in the wake of Portugal's war with Napoleonic France. The Portuguese Prince Regent, the future King John VI, with his incapacitated mother, Queen Maria I of Portugal and the Royal Court, escaped to the colony of Brazil in 1808. With the defeat of Napoleon in 1815, there were calls for the return of the Portuguese Monarch to Lisbon; the Portuguese Prince Regent enjoyed life in Rio de Janeiro, where the monarchy was at the time more popular and where he enjoyed more freedom, and he was thus unwilling to return to Europe. However, those advocating the return of the Court to Lisbon argued that Brazil was only a colony and that it was not right for Portugal to be governed from a colony. On the other hand, leading Brazilian courtiers pressed for the elevation of Brazil from the rank of a colony, so that they could enjoy the full status of being nationals of the mother-country. Brazilian nationalists also supported the move, because it indicated that Brazil would no longer be submissive to the interests of Portugal, but would be of equal status within a transatlantic monarchy.

==== Spain ====
Beginning in 1492 with the voyages of Christopher Columbus under the direction of Isabella I of Castile, the Spanish Crown amassed a large American empire over three centuries, spreading first from the Caribbean to Central America, most of South America, Mexico, what is today the Southwestern United States, and the Pacific coast of North America up to Alaska. These regions formed the majority of the Viceroyalty of New Spain, the Viceroyalty of Peru, the Viceroyalty of New Granada, and the Viceroyalty of the Río de la Plata in each of which the Spanish monarch was represented by a viceroy. By the early 19th century, however, the Spanish sovereign's possessions in the Americas began a series of independence movements, which culminated in the Crown's loss of all its colonies on the mainland of North and South America by 1825. The remaining colonies of Cuba and Puerto Rico were occupied by the United States following the Spanish–American War, ending Spanish rule in the Americas by 1899.

==== Sweden ====
For a period of time the French ceded sovereignty of the island of Saint Barthélemy to the Swedes but it was eventually returned. Saint Barthélemy (1784–1878) was operated as a free port. The capital city of Gustavia retains its Swedish name.

== Self-proclaimed monarchs ==
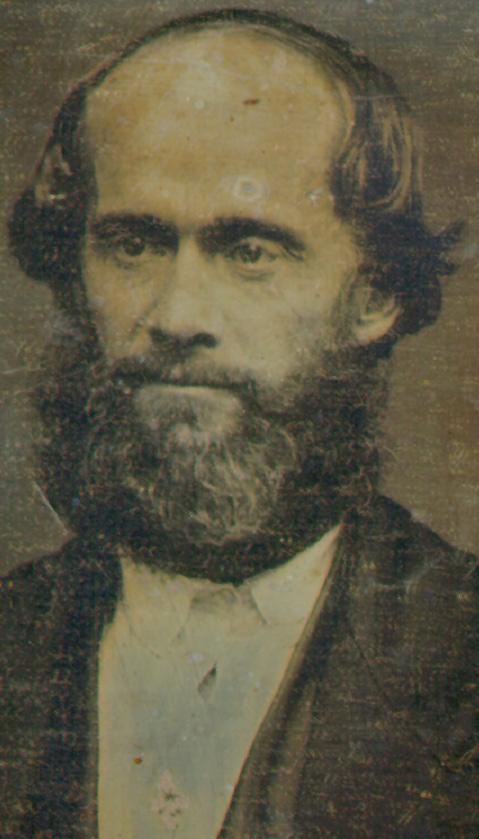
1856 daguerreotype of James Strang

These entities were never recognised as de jure or legitimate governments:

James J. Strang

James Strang, a would-be successor to the Mormon prophet Joseph Smith, Jr., proclaimed himself "king" over his Strangite church in 1850, which was then concentrated mostly on Beaver Island in Lake Michigan. On 8 July of that year, he was physically crowned in an elaborate coronation ceremony complete with crown, sceptre, throne, ermine robe and breastplate. Although he never claimed legal sovereignty over Beaver Island or any other geographical entity, Strang managed (as a member of the Michigan State Legislature) to have his "kingdom" constituted as a separate county, where his followers held all county offices, and Strang's word was law. U.S. President Millard Fillmore ordered an investigation into Strang's colony, which resulted in Strang's trial in Detroit for treason, trespass, counterfeiting, and other crimes, but the jury found the "king" innocent of all charges. Strang was eventually assassinated by two disgruntled followers in 1856, and his kingdom—together with his royal regalia—vanished.

Joshua Norton

Joshua Abraham Norton, an Englishman who emigrated to San Francisco, California, in 1849, proclaimed himself "Emperor of These United States" in 1859, later adding the title "Protector of Mexico". Though never recognized by the U.S. or Mexican governments, he was accorded a certain degree of deference within San Francisco itself, including reserved balcony seats (for which he was never charged) at local theatres, and salutes by policemen who passed him on the street. He was active in various civic issues and advocated for the bridging of San Francisco Bay. Specially printed currency authorized by Norton was accepted as legal tender within several businesses in the city. When Norton died in 1880, he was given a lavish funeral attended by over 30,000 persons.

James Harden-Hickey

James Harden-Hickey was a self-proclaimed prince, who attempted to establish the so-called Principality of Trinidad on Trindade and the Martim Vaz Islands in the South Atlantic Ocean during the late 19th century. Although initially garnering some newspaper attention, Hickey's claims were ignored or ridiculed by other nations, and the islands eventually were occupied by Brazil.

Redonda

The small uninhabited island of Redonda is part of Antigua and Barbuda, a Commonwealth country. There is a micronation, the "Kingdom of Redonda", which largely consists of people in England claiming to be king of an island they have never visited. The micronation dates to fantasy writer M. P. Shiel, who created a dubious account in 1929 that his father, Matthew Dowdy Shiell, had asked for and been given the title of King of Redonda by the British colonial authorities in 1865. The younger Shiel then took the throne at the age of 15 in 1880. No record exists of such an unlikely grant, nor even of the two visiting the island. Nevertheless, John Gawsworth took up the mantle in 1947 and claimed to be king afterward, sold the kingship to others several times, and sold ranks of nobility. The result of the repeated sales is that at least 9 people claim to all be king of Redonda. None of those involved appear to have ever tried to physically establish themselves on the island itself.

=== Araucania and Patagonia ===
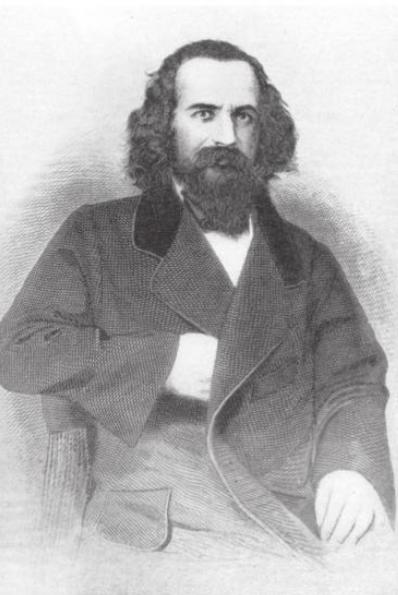
Orélie-Antoine de Tounens, claimant to king of Araucania and Patagonia

The Kingdom of Araucania and Patagonia was a short-lived attempt at establishing a constitutional monarchy, founded by French lawyer and adventurer Orelie-Antoine de Tounens in 1860. Nominally, the "kingdom" encompassed the present-day Argentine part of Patagonia and a small segment of Chile, where Mapuche peoples were fighting to maintain their sovereignty against the advancing Chilean and Argentine armed forces. However, Orélie-Antoine never exercised sovereignty over the claimed territory. Rather, he "ruled" for around fourteen months in a small territory around the town Perquenco (at the time mainly a small Mapuche tent village), which was also the declared capital of his claimed kingdom.

Orélie-Antoine felt that the Mapuche of the region would only be acknowledged by the surrounding powers if they had a European leader such as himself, and was accordingly elected by a group of Mapuche loncos (chieftains) to be their king. He attempted to gain diplomatic recognition and support from the French government for his claims, but these efforts proved unsuccessful: the French consul concluded that Tounens was insane, and Araucania and Patagonia was never recognized by any country. The Chileans simply went on with the occupation of the Araucanía, a historical process which concluded in 1883 with Chile establishing control over the region. Orélie-Antoine was captured in 1862, and was imprisoned in an insane asylum in Chile. After several fruitless attempts to return to his kingdom (thwarted by both Chilean and Argentine authorities), Tounens died penniless in 1878 in Tourtoirac, France. The most recent pretender to this claimed kingdom is Frédéric Luz, who succeeded Jean-Michel Parasiliti di Para.

== See also ==
- Afro-Bolivian monarchy
- Canadian Confederation
- List of monarchs in the Americas
- Monarchies in Africa
- Monarchies in Asia
- Monarchies in Europe
- Monarchies in Oceania
