= Governor Abbott =

Governor Abbot or Abbott may refer to:

- Edward Abbott, of Forts of Vincennes, Indiana
- Greg Abbott (born 1957), 48th Governor of Texas
- Maurice Abbot (1565–1642), Governor of the East India Company from 1624 to 1638
- Tony Abbott (governor) (born 1941), Governor of Montserrat from 1997 to 2001
