= Governor Pearce =

Governor Pearce may refer to:

- Andrew Pearce (diplomat) (fl. 2010s), 15th Governor of Montserrat since 2018
- Francis Barrow Pearce (1866–1926), Acting Governor of Nyasaland in 1910
- Howard Pearce (born 1949), Governor of the Falkland Islands from 2002 to 2006

== See also ==
- Governor Pierce (disambiguation)
