= 1940 Montserratian general election =

General elections were held in Montserrat in 1940.

== Electoral system ==
The Legislative Council had nine seats; four elected, three held by government officials and two by nominees appointed by the Governor.
