= Governor Thompson =

Governor Thompson may refer to:

- David P. Thompson (1834–1901), 6th Governor of Idaho Territory
- Hugh Smith Thompson (1836–1904), 81st Governor of South Carolina
- James Thompson (civil servant) (1848–1929), Acting Governor of Madras in 1904
- James R. Thompson (born 1936), 37th Governor of Illinois
- Melvin E. Thompson (1903–1980), 70th Governor of Georgia
- Thomas Perronet Thompson (1783–1869), Governor of Sierra Leone from 1808 to 1810
- Tommy Thompson (born 1941), 42nd Governor of Wisconsin
- Willoughby Harry Thompson (1919–2018), 1st Governor of Montserrat from 1971 until 1974

== See also ==
- Governor Thomson (disambiguation)
