= Elizabeth Carriere =

Governor of Montserrat from 2015 to 2018

Elizabeth Carriere OBE
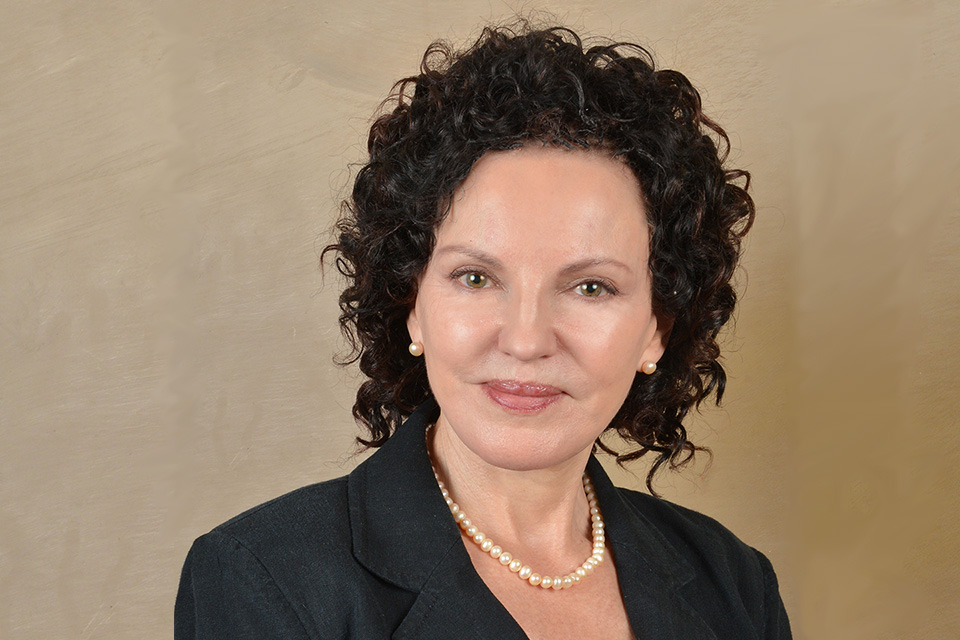

Governor of Montserrat
- In office 5 August 2015 – 2 January 2018
- Monarch: Elizabeth II
- Premier: Donaldson Romeo
- Deputy: Alric Taylor (2015–16); Lyndell Simpson (acting; 2016–18)
- Preceded by: Adrian Davis
- Succeeded by: Andrew Pearce

Personal details
- Education: University of London; University of Manitoba

Elizabeth Anne Carriere OBE is a former British civil servant working in international development. From 2015 to 2018, she served as Governor of Montserrat.

== Biography ==
Carriere has an MSc in Public Policy and Management from the University of London and has studied the sociology of adult education at the University of British Columbia and anthropology at the University of Manitoba. Like her predecessor as governor, Adrian Davis, Carriere was a senior civil servant with the Department for International Development (DFID). She was posted to DFID Indonesia, and has subsequently served as head of DFID in Jamaica, Bangladesh, the Caribbean regional office, Rwanda, and South Sudan.

In March 2015, it was announced that Carriere would succeed Adrian Davis as Governor of Montserrat. She is the second female governor after Deborah Barnes-Jones (2004–2007). Carriere was sworn in at Government House on 5 August 2015. In August 2017, she announced that she would resign from her post as Governor and from the British civil service in early January 2018 to take up an international development position in Africa with a non-governmental organization. The British Government announced that she would be replaced by Andrew Pearce.

After leaving her role in Montserrat, Carriere went on to take up the position of Managing Deputy Regional Director for the Great Lakes of Central Africa with CARE, a leading humanitarian organisation. Carriere led the country operations in Uganda, Rwanda, DRC and Burundi.

Government offices
Preceded by Adrian Davis	Governor of Montserrat; 2015–2018	Succeeded by Andrew Pearce
