= Longrigg =

Longrigg is an English surname. Notable people with the surname include:

- Roger Longrigg (1929–2000), British novelist
- Bunty Longrigg (1906–1974), English cricketer
- Stephen Hemsley Longrigg (1893–1979), British army officer, military governor, oil company manager and writer on the history of oil in the Middle East
- Tony Longrigg (born 1944), British diplomat, Governor of Montserrat 2001–2004
