= Governor Simpson =

Governor Simpson may refer to:

- Edward Simpson (governor) (1860–1930), Acting 20th Naval Governor of Guam in 1916
- George Simpson (HBC administrator) (c. 1792–1860), Governor of Rupert's Land from 1821 to 1861
- Lyndell Simpson (fl. 2010s), Acting Governor of Montserrat in 2018
- Milward Simpson (1897–1993), 23rd Governor of Wyoming
- Oramel H. Simpson (1870–1932), 39th Governor of Louisiana
- William Dunlap Simpson (1823–1890), 78th Governor of South Carolina
