= List of monarchs in the Americas =

This list of monarchs in the Americas includes all monarchs who have reigned the various kingdoms and territories that have existed in the Americas throughout recorded history.

== Current monarchies ==
Table of independent American monarchies
State	Reigns since	Type	Succession	Dynasty	Title	Image	Monarch	Born	Age	First-in-line
Antigua and Barbuda	8 September 2022	Constitutional	Hereditary (absolute primogeniture)	Windsor	King of Antigua and Barbuda		Charles III	14 November 1948	77 y.	William, Prince of Wales
Bahamas	8 September 2022	Constitutional	Hereditary (absolute primogeniture)	Windsor	King of the Bahamas		Charles III	14 November 1948	77 y.	William, Prince of Wales
Belize	8 September 2022	Constitutional	Hereditary (absolute primogeniture)	Windsor	King of Belize		Charles III	14 November 1948	77 y.	William, Prince of Wales
Canada	8 September 2022	Constitutional	Hereditary (absolute primogeniture)	Windsor	King of Canada		Charles III	14 November 1948	77 y.	William, Prince of Wales
Grenada	8 September 2022	Constitutional	Hereditary (absolute primogeniture)	Windsor	King of Grenada		Charles III	14 November 1948	77 y.	William, Prince of Wales
Jamaica	8 September 2022	Constitutional	Hereditary (absolute primogeniture)	Windsor	King of Jamaica		Charles III	14 November 1948	77 y.	William, Prince of Wales
Saint Kitts and Nevis	8 September 2022	Constitutional	Hereditary (absolute primogeniture)	Windsor	King of Saint Kitts and Nevis		Charles III	14 November 1948	77 y.	William, Prince of Wales
Saint Lucia	8 September 2022	Constitutional	Hereditary (absolute primogeniture)	Windsor	King of Saint Lucia		Charles III	14 November 1948	77 y.	William, Prince of Wales
Saint Vincent and the Grenadines	8 September 2022	Constitutional	Hereditary (absolute primogeniture)	Windsor	King of Saint Vincent and the Grenadines		Charles III	14 November 1948	77 y.	William, Prince of Wales

Table of monarchs over dependent American territories
Territory	Reigns since	Type	Succession	Dynasty	Title	Image	Monarch	Born	Age	First-in-line
Anguilla	8 September 2022	Constitutional	Hereditary (absolute primogeniture)	Windsor	King of the United Kingdom		Charles III	14 November 1948	77 y.	William, Prince of Wales
Aruba	30 April 2013	Constitutional	Hereditary (absolute primogeniture)	Orange-Nassau	King of the Netherlands		Willem-Alexander	27 April 1967	59 y.	Catharina-Amalia, Princess of Orange
Bermuda	8 September 2022	Constitutional	Hereditary (absolute primogeniture)	Windsor	King of the United Kingdom		Charles III	14 November 1948	77 y.	William, Prince of Wales
British Virgin Islands	8 September 2022	Constitutional	Hereditary (absolute primogeniture)	Windsor	King of the United Kingdom		Charles III	14 November 1948	77 y.	William, Prince of Wales
Cayman Islands	8 September 2022	Constitutional	Hereditary (absolute primogeniture)	Windsor	King of the United Kingdom		Charles III	14 November 1948	77 y.	William, Prince of Wales
Curaçao	30 April 2013	Constitutional	Hereditary (absolute primogeniture)	Orange-Nassau	King of the Netherlands		Willem-Alexander	27 April 1967	59 y.	Catharina-Amalia, Princess of Orange
Falkland Islands	8 September 2022	Constitutional	Hereditary (absolute primogeniture)	Windsor	King of the United Kingdom		Charles III	14 November 1948	77 y.	William, Prince of Wales
Greenland	14 January 2024	Constitutional	Hereditary (absolute primogeniture)	Glücksburg	King of Denmark		Frederik X	26 May 1968	58 y.	Christian, Crown Prince of Denmark
Montserrat	8 September 2022	Constitutional	Hereditary (absolute primogeniture)	Windsor	King of the United Kingdom		Charles III	14 November 1948	77 y.	William, Prince of Wales
Sint Maarten	30 April 2013	Constitutional	Hereditary (absolute primogeniture)	Orange-Nassau	King of the Netherlands		Willem-Alexander	27 April 1967	59 y.	Catharina-Amalia, Princess of Orange
South Georgia and the South Sandwich Islands	8 September 2022	Constitutional	Hereditary (absolute primogeniture)	Windsor	King of the United Kingdom		Charles III	14 November 1948	77 y.	William, Prince of Wales
Turks and Caicos Islands	8 September 2022	Constitutional	Hereditary (absolute primogeniture)	Windsor	King of the United Kingdom		Charles III	14 November 1948	77 y.	William, Prince of Wales

== Former monarchies ==
State	Reigns since	Type	Succession	Dynasty	Title	Image	Monarch	Life	Age	First-in-line
Barbados	1966–2021	Constitutional	Hereditary (absolute primogeniture)	Windsor	Queen of Barbados		Elizabeth II	1926–2022	96	Charles, Prince of Wales
(Empire of Brazil) Brazil	1831–1889	Constitutional	Hereditary (male-line primogeniture)	Braganza	Emperor of Brazil		Pedro II	1825–1891	66 y.	Isabel, Princess Imperial of Brazil
Guyana	1966–1970	Constitutional	Hereditary (male-preference primogeniture)	Windsor	Queen of Guyana		Elizabeth II	1926–2022	96	Charles, Prince of Wales
Haiti	1849–1859	Absolute	Hereditary (male-line primogeniture)	Soulouque	Emperor of Haiti		Faustin I	1782–1867	84 y.	Olive Soulouque
(Second Mexican Empire) Mexico	1864–1867	Constitutional	Hereditary (male-line primogeniture)	Habsburg	Emperor of Mexico		Maximilian I	1832–1867	34 y.	Agustín de Iturbide y Green
Suriname	1954–1975	Constitutional	Hereditary (male-preference cognatic primogeniture)	Orange-Nassau	Queen of the Netherlands		Juliana	1909–2004	94 y.	Beatrix of the Netherlands
Trinidad and Tobago	1962–1976	Constitutional	Hereditary (male-preference primogeniture)	Windsor	Queen of Trinidad and Tobago		Elizabeth II	1926–2022	96	Charles, Prince of Wales
