= Peter Waterworth =

Governor of Montserrat from 2007 to 2011

Governor of Montserrat
- In office 27 July 2007 – 3 March 2011
- Monarch: Queen Elizabeth II
- Preceded by: Deborah Barnes-Jones
- Succeeded by: Adrian Davis

Personal details
- Born: 15 April 1957 (age 69) Belfast, Northern Ireland, UK
- Spouse: Catherine Waterworth
- Profession: Barrister, diplomat

Peter Andrew Waterworth (born 15 April 1957) is a British barrister and diplomat, who was the Governor of Montserrat from 2007 to 2011.

== Biography ==
Waterworth is originally from Belfast and was schooled at Methodist College. He entered Durham University in 1975, reading for a law degree as a member of Hatfield College, graduating in 1978. Waterworth was also Senior Man of Hatfield from 1977 to 1978. He later studied at Downing College, Cambridge, completing an LLM degree in 1982.

== Career ==
Waterworth practised as a barrister from 1983 until 1987, when he joined the Foreign Office. He was an Assistant Legal Adviser from 1987 to 1990, before being posted to Bonn (which had until recently been the capital of West Germany) where he served until 1994. He then returned to London to work in the Middle East Department, and from 1996 to 2000 was First Secretary at the British Embassy in Rome. After a period in the Northern Ireland Office, Waterworth was Counsellor in Islamabad from 2003 to 2005 and Consul-General in Lagos from 2005 to 2007.

He was sworn in at the Legislative Council of Montserrat on 27 July 2007, 19 years to the day since he was last in Montserrat, when he served as a Foreign and Commonwealth Office legal adviser.

He has a wife, Catherine.

Government offices
Preceded by Deborah Barnes-Jones	Governor of Montserrat; 2007–2011	Succeeded by Adrian Davis
