= 2025 in Montserrat =

- Decades: 2000s; 2010s; 2020s
- See also: Other events of 2024; Timeline of Montserrat history

Events in the year 2025 in Montserrat.

== Incumbents ==
- Monarch: Charles III
- Governor: Sarah Tucker
- Premier:Reuben Meade

== Sports ==
- 13 – 21 September: Montserrat at the 2025 World Athletics Championships
