= David Kenneth Hay Dale =

Governor of Montserrat from 1980 to 1984

David Kenneth Hay Dale, CBE (27 January 1927 – 8 November 2001) was a British colonial administrator. He was Governor of Montserrat from 1980 to 1984 or 1985.
