= Wyn Jones (colonial administrator) =

Governor of Montserrat from 1977 to 1980

Governor of Montserrat
- In office 1977–1980

Gwilym Wyn Jones, CBE (12 July 1926 – 23 October 1993) was a British colonial administrator. He was Governor of Montserrat from 1977 to 1980.

The son of the Welsh Presbyterian minister the Rev. John Jones, Wyn Jones was born in Llanrwst and only spoke Welsh until he was nine years old. He was educated at Llanrwst Grammar School and the University College of North Wales, Bangor, where he read Welsh. He served in the Royal Navy from 1944 to 1947, then joined the Colonial Administrative Service as a cadet, spending two years at the University of London before proceeding overseas.

Jones was posted to the Gilbert and Ellice Islands in 1950, before being transferred to the British Solomon Islands. He was appointed Governor of Montserrat in 1977, and served there until 1980. He was appointed CBE in 1977.

On his retirement, Jones returned to Wales, where he held a variety of positions.
