= Woodlands, Montserrat =

Woodlands
- Town
- Location of Woodlands within Montserrat Woodlands (the Caribbean)
- Coordinates: 16°45′N 62°13′W
- Country: United Kingdom
- Overseas territory: Montserrat
- Time zone: UTC-4 (Atlantic)

Woodlands is a village in Montserrat, a British Overseas Territory in the West Indies, situated on the west coast of the island, directly north of Salem in Saint Peter Parish.

The official residence of the governor, Government House, located in Woodlands.
