= Adrian Davis (civil servant) =

Governor of Montserrat from 2011 to 2015

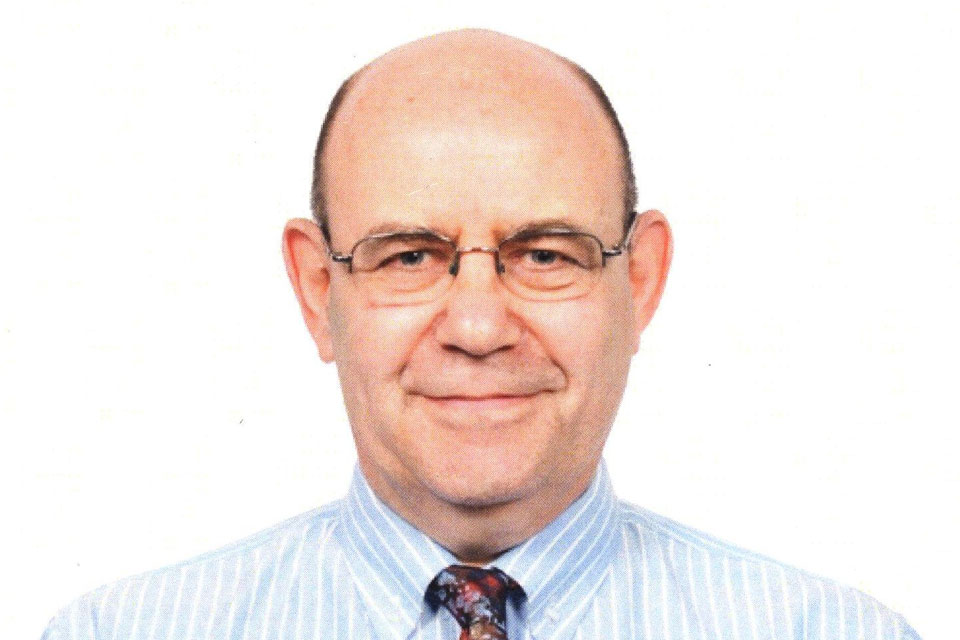

13th Governor of Montserrat
- In office 8 April 2011 – 8 July 2015
- Monarch: Elizabeth II
- Premier: Reuben Meade (2011–2014); Donaldson Romeo (2014–2015)
- Preceded by: Peter Waterworth
- Succeeded by: Elizabeth Carriere

Personal details
- Born: London, United Kingdom
- Spouse: Sujue Davis

Adrian Derek Davis is a British economist and civil servant, who was the Governor of Montserrat from 2011 to 2015.

From 1989, he worked for the Department for International Development, and before that its predecessor, the Overseas Development Administration.

In March 2010, he was appointed Governor of Montserrat, replacing Peter Waterworth who was retiring from the diplomatic service. Davis was sworn in as Governor on 8 April 2011. His term as Governor ended on 8 July 2015. Elizabeth Carriere was sworn in as his replacement on 5 August.

Government offices
Preceded by Peter Waterworth	Governor of Montserrat; 2011–2015	Succeeded by Elizabeth Carriere
