= Lyndell Simpson =

Montserratian politician

Lyndell Simpson is a Montserratian who was the Deputy Governor of Montserrat in 2018. She succeeded Elizabeth Carriere, who held the position since 2015, and was succeeded by Andrew Pearce.
