= Frank Savage =

Governor of Montserrat from 1993 to 1997

Frank Savage CMG LVO OBE
- Occupation: Diplomat
- Known for: Governor of Montserrat, 1993–1997; Governor of the British Virgin Islands, 1998–2002

Francis Joseph "Frank" Savage CMG LVO OBE (born 1943) is a British diplomat, who was Governor of Montserrat from 1993 to 1997. His tenure included the early stages of the volcanic eruption of the Soufriere Hills Volcano, from 1995 to 1997.

== Career ==
Savage was appointed an officer of Her Majesty's diplomatic service in November 1977. His career included a term as first secretary, in the British high commission in Lagos, Nigeria, followed by appointments as Governor of Montserrat (1993–1997) and the British Virgin Islands (1998–2002).

Savage worked for some years as an adviser on disaster management to the overseas territories department of the British government, and retired from the British Foreign and Commonwealth Office in 2013. He was appointed director of the Commonwealth Disaster Management Agency (CDMA) in 2021.

== Awards ==
Savage was appointed Lieutenant of the Royal Victorian Order (LVO) in November 1986. He was awarded an OBE in December 1988, and was appointed Companion of the Order of St Michael and St George in June 1996.

Government offices
Preceded by David G. P. Taylor	Governor of Montserrat; 1993–1997	Succeeded by Tony Abbott
