= Sarita Francis =

Montserrat civil servant (born 1953)

- Born: Sarita Violeta Francis; 11 September 1953 (age 72); Montserrat
- Occupations: Educator; Civil servant
- Years active: 1972–present
- Known for: First Female Deputy Governor of Montserrat

Sarita Violeta Francis (born 11 September 1953) is the Director of the Montserrat National Trust.

She was formerly a teacher and has held numerous governmental posts, including serving as a Minister in the Ministry of Agriculture, the Director of Housing, and the Chief Establishment Officer.

Francis was appointed the first female Deputy Governor of Montserrat in 2009. She was also honored with the Order of the British Empire in 2012.

== Biography ==
Sarita Violeta Francis was born in Montserrat on 11 September 1953. In 1972, she became a teacher of geography and social studies. In 1992, she was appointed as senior teacher and vice principal of the Salem Campus of the Montserrat Secondary School.

In 1993, Francis was charged with development of an environmental education strategy for the country, taking an appointment with the United Nations Development Programme. The following year, she began working with the Montserrat National Trust as Environmental Educator. Beginning in 1997, Francis appointed to the Ministry of Agriculture and then in 1999 became the first Director of Housing. Three years later, she was promoted to serve in the Office of the Chief Minister as Permanent Secretary. After six years, in 2007, Frances became the permanent Secretary of Administration and then later that same year became the first Chief Establishment Officer of Montserrat.

On 15 October 2009 Francis became the first woman Deputy Governor of Montserrat. In March, 2011, she became acting governor, when Peter Andrew Waterworth stepped down as governor. She served as acting head of state through April, when the governor's replacement, Adrian Davis, arrived. Francis was honored with the Order of the British Empire in 2012 for her work with the National Trust and later that same year, she stepped down as deputy governor when her replacement Alric Taylor was appointed for the next term.

She has served with the National trust since her original appointment in various capacities for 20 over years, and is the current executive director. The organization strives to protect and preserve the history and culture of Montserrat through a variety of initiatives including annual cultural events, archaeological projects, and an archives digitization project. In 2014, she also became a director of the UK Overseas Territories Conservation Forum which has launched numerous environmental projects on the island including a publication of the bird species on the island.
