= Derek Matthews =

Governor of Montserrat from 1974 to 1976

Governor of Montserrat
- In office 1974–1976

Norman Derek Matthews, OBE (19 March 1922 – 21 July 1976) was a British colonial administrator and diplomat. He was Governor of Montserrat from 1974 until his death in 1976.

== Biography ==
The son of ophthalmic surgeon Dr Horatio Matthews and of Mrs Ruth Fryer Matthews, Derek Matthews was educated at Epsom College and the University of London. After service in the Royal Navy from 1940 to 1946, Matthews joined the Colonial Service (later Her Majesty's Overseas Civil Service) and served in Nyasaland from 1946 until 1964. From 1964 to 1967 he was a Permanent Secretary of the Ministry of Development and Planning in the Government of Malawi. He was appointed an OBE in 1963.

He joined the Foreign and Commonwealth Office in 1967 as a temporary officer, then became established in 1972. After serving as acting governor for three months in that year, he was appointed Governor of Montserrat in June 1974. He died of a heart attack at Government House in Plymouth, Montserrat, two years later.
