= Governor Pierce =

Governor Pierce may refer to:

- Benjamin Pierce (governor) (1757–1839), 11th Governor of New Hampshire
- Gilbert A. Pierce (1839–1901), 8th Governor of Dakota Territory
- Walter M. Pierce (1861–1954), 17th Governor of Oregon

== See also ==
- Governor Pearce (disambiguation)
