= 2023 in Montserrat =

- Decades: 2000s; 2010s; 2020s
- See also: Other events of 2023; Timeline of Montserrat history

Events in the year 2023 in Montserrat.

== Incumbents ==
- Monarch: Charles III
- Governor: Sarah Tucker
- Premier: Easton Taylor-Farrell

== Events ==
- September: Hurricane Lee causes a hurricane warning in Montserrat, although it doesn't make landfall.
