= Governor Thomson =

Governor Thomson may refer to:

- Charles Antoine François Thomson (1845–1898), Governor of Cochinchina from 1882 to 1885
- Charles Poulett Thomson, 1st Baron Sydenham (1799–1841), Governor General of the Province of Canada from 1839 to 1841
- Graeme Thomson (1875–1933), Governor of British Guiana from 1923 to 1925, Governor of Nigeria from 1925 to 1931, and 26th Governor of British Ceylon from 1931 to 1933
- Ian Thomson (colonial administrator) (1920–2008), Governor of the British Virgin Islands from 1967 to 1971
- Meldrim Thomson Jr. (1912–2001), 73rd Governor of New Hampshire
- Vernon Wallace Thomson (1905–1988), 34th Governor of Wisconsin

== See also ==
- Governor Thompson (disambiguation)
