= Willoughby Harry Thompson =

British colonial administrator

Willoughby Harry "Tommy" Thompson CMG (3 December 1919 – 25 January 2018) was a British colonial administrator who served in various posts in a number of countries, including Kenya, the Falkland Islands, and British Virgin Islands. He was the first Governor of Montserrat from 1971 until 1974.

Thompson was born in Astwood Bank, Worcestershire to Willoughby and Dorothy Markham Thompson. He joined the army and became a commissioned officer in 1942. He served in East Africa and then worked in various posts Kenya after leaving the army. He went to the Falkland Islands to work as the colonial secretary in 1963 and then worked in a number of posts, including the acting governor, the magistrate with jurisdiction and later the acting judge of the Supreme Court in the Falkland Islands, South Georgia and the British Antarctic Territory. During his time in the Falklands, Argentina began to express an aggressive intent towards the British colony. In 1968, he was appointed administrator to the British Virgin Islands, but was sent to Anguilla after a few months to deal with a rebellion against independence there, and help set it up as a separate colony. He became the governor of Montserrat in 1971, but retired to Essex in 1974. He was appointed CMG in the 1974 Birthday Honours.

He died on 25 January 2018.
