= Government House, Montserrat =

Official residence of the governor of Montserrat

Coordinates: 16.759°N 62.225°W

Government House
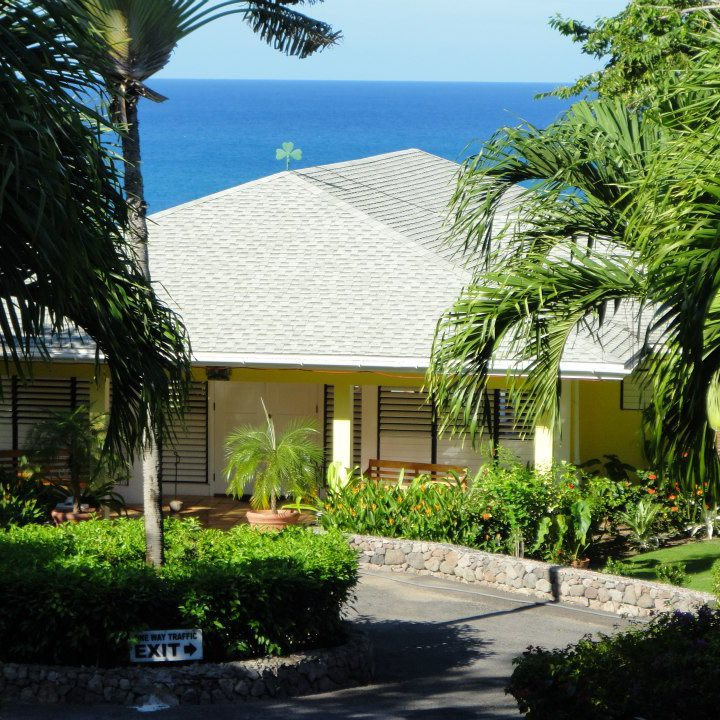
- Entrance of the Governor's Residence
- Interactive map of the Government House area

General information
- Type: official residence
- Location: Woodlands, Montserrat
- Current tenants: Governor of Montserrat
- Owner: Government of Montserrat

Government House is the official residence of the governor of Montserrat, located in Woodlands, the northern safe zone of the island of Montserrat. The property was constructed after the evacuation of the previous residence in Plymouth due to the 1995 eruption of the Soufrière Hills volcano.

== History ==
The original Government House, located in Plymouth, the island’s former colonial capital, had been built by the colonial government in the early 20th century. It was abandoned when Plymouth was evacuated in 1995, due to devastating activity from the Soufrière Hills volcano. The original Government House building is still standing, although it is in a state of considerable disrepair.

Following the crisis, a new, modern Government House was constructed in Woodlands alongside the resettlement of administrative buildings to Brades and Little Bay. The current Government House is a modern construction situated in extensive gardens.

As well as being the residence of the Governor of Montserrat, Government House is used for national and ceremonial functions, as well as receptions and meetings with foreign dignitaries and heads of state. It is also the official residence of the head of state of Montserrat (currently King Charles III) when staying in Montserrat.

In 2019, it emerged that the new Government House was having structural problems, and until those were resolved, no functions were able to be held at the property.

== See also ==
- Government House – elsewhere in the Commonwealth or British Overseas Territories
- Government Houses of the British Empire and Commonwealth

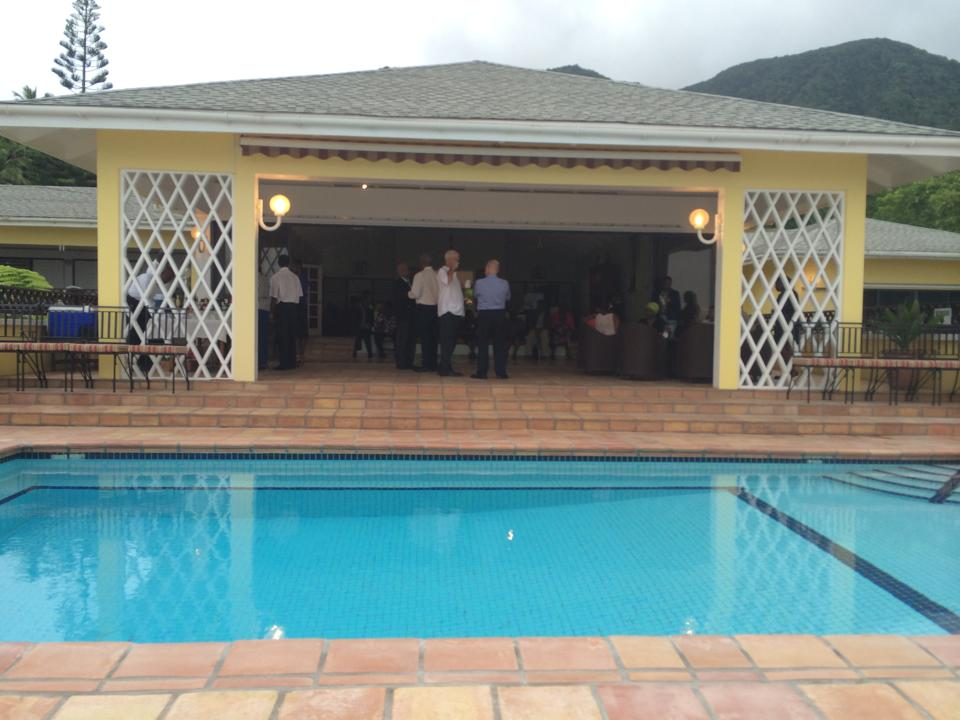
Pool at the Governor's Residence

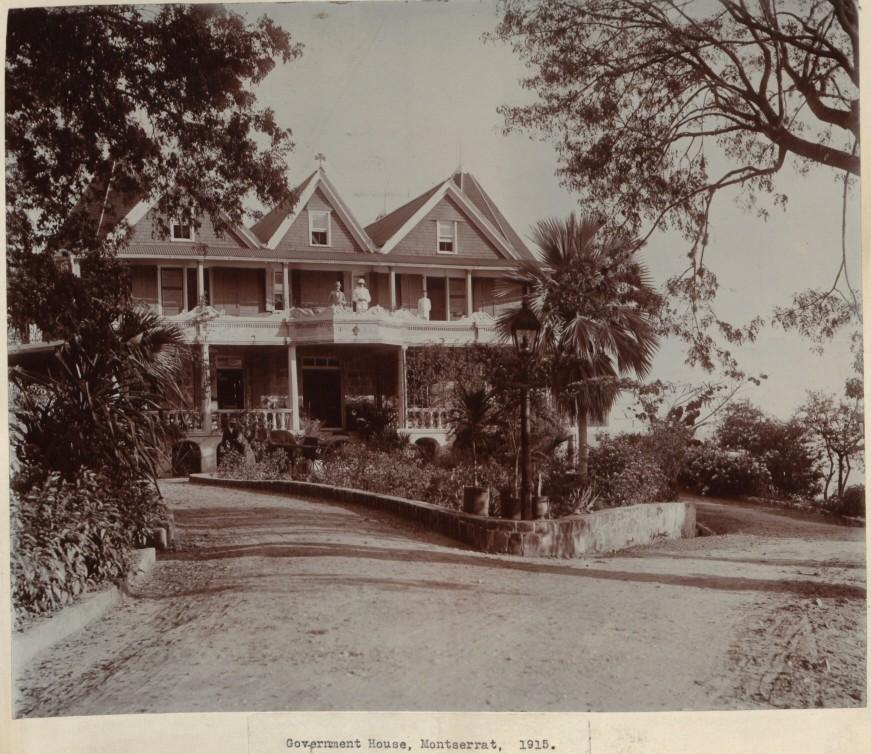
Old Government House, Plymouth, 1915
