= Tony Longrigg =

Governor of Montserrat from 2001 to 2004

Tony Longrigg CMG

Governor of Montserrat
- In office 11 May 2001 – 2 April 2004
- Preceded by: Tony Abbott
- Succeeded by: Deborah Barnes-Jones

Personal details
- Born: Anthony James Longrigg; 21 April 1944 (age 81)
- Spouse: Jane Rosa Cowlin

Anthony James Longrigg, CMG (born 21 April 1944) is a British diplomat. He was Governor of Montserrat from 2001 to 2004.

He joined the Foreign and Commonwealth Office in 1972, and was posted in Moscow and Madrid. He was Commissioner of the British Antarctic Territory from 1995 to 1997.

In 2003, a petition signed by 200 people in Montserrat, called upon the British government to sack Longrigg as governor, stating that his policies were ruining the economy of the territory. Longrigg had prevented some citizens from returning to certain areas of the territory threatened by volcanic eruption, a decision he made based on scientific advice provided by the director of the Montserrat Volcano Observatory (MVO) and the scientific advisory committee.

== Honours ==
Longrigg was made a Companion of the Order of St Michael and St George in the 1992 New Year Honours while at the British embassy in Moscow.

Government offices
Preceded by Tony Abbott	Governor of Montserrat; 2001–2004	Succeeded by Deborah Barnes-Jones
