= Tony Abbott (diplomat) =

Governor of Montserrat from 1997 to 2001

Tony Abbott CMG OBE

Governor of Montserrat
- In office 1997–2001
- Monarch: Queen Elizabeth II
- Preceded by: Frank Savage
- Succeeded by: Howard A. Fergus (acting)

Personal details
- Born: Anthony John Abbott; 9 September 1941 (age 85) Ashton-under-Lyne, Lancashire, England

Anthony John Abbott (born 9 September 1941) is an English diplomat, who served as Governor of Montserrat from 1997 to 2001.

Abbott was born in Ashton-under-Lyne, Lancashire in 1941 and joined the British diplomatic service in 1959. He was a vice consul in Iran and Finland in the 1960s, then returned to the UK where he was press officer for the Foreign and Commonwealth Office from 1969 to 1972. He then served as a passport officer in Zambia and a consul in Chile, then joined the secretariat of the President of the European Commission. In 1981 he was seconded to the British Overseas Trade Board, then from 1983 to 1987 served as first secretary and consul in Lisbon, Portugal. From 1987 to 1991 he served as First Secretary and later Deputy High Commissioner at the British High Commission in Calcutta, India. In 1991, he was part of the EC monitoring missions in Croatia and Bosnia-Herzegovina.

After returning to the UK, he was deputy head of the training department in the FCO, then spent four years as consul-general in Perth, Western Australia. In September 1997, he was sworn in as Governor of Montserrat, at the peak of the eruption of the Soufriere Hills Volcano. He served on Montserrat until 2001. From June 2001 to May 2004, Abbott was head of the Pitcairn Island's logistic team based in Auckland, New Zealand.

== Awards ==
In June 1986, Abbott was appointed Member of the Most Excellent Order of the British Empire (MBE). Abbott was appointed Officer of the Most Excellent Order of the British Empire (OBE) in June 1997, and Companion of the Order of St Michael and St George (CMG) in June 2001.

Government offices
Preceded by Frank Savage	Governor of Montserrat; 1997–2001	Succeeded by Tony Longrigg
