= Deborah Barnes-Jones =

Governor of Montserrat from 2004 to 2007

Deborah Barnes Jones

Governor of Montserrat
- In office 10 May 2004 – 6 July 2007
- Monarch: Elizabeth II
- Preceded by: Tony Longrigg
- Succeeded by: Peter Waterworth

Personal details
- Born: Deborah Elizabeth Vavasseur Barnes; 6 October 1956 (age 69) Kent, England, United Kingdom
- Spouse: Fredrick Richard Jones
- Children: Two daughters
- Occupation: Diplomat

Deborah Elizabeth Vavasseur Barnes (born 6 October 1956), known since her marriage as Deborah Barnes-Jones, is a British diplomat and administrator.

== Career ==
Barnes joined the Foreign and Commonwealth Office in 1980. She was posted to the British Embassy in Moscow between 1983 and 1985, when she was promoted to First Secretary and was seconded to the Cabinet Office, remaining there until 1986. From 1988 to 1992 she was posted as First Secretary (Chancery) to the embassy in Tel Aviv, Israel, then returned to the Foreign Office in London for four years. She was Deputy Head of Mission in Uruguay from 1996 to 2001, when she was appointed as the British ambassador to the Republic of Georgia.

In 2004 Barnes-Jones was appointed as the Governor of Montserrat and was sworn in at a special session of the island's Legislative Council held in Brades on 10 May 2004, becoming the first female governor appointed by a reigning British monarch to a British Overseas Territory. She remained in post until 6 July 2007.

In 1986, she married Fredrick Richard Jones, an American diplomat, and they have twin daughters (Jennifer and Hilary), born in 1991.

Diplomatic posts
Preceded by Richard Jenkins	British Ambassador to Georgia; 2001–2004	Succeeded by Donald MacLaren
Government offices
Preceded by Tony Longrigg	Governor of Montserrat; 2004–2007	Succeeded by Peter Waterworth
