= Harriet Cross (diplomat) =

Governor of Montserrat since 2025

Her Excellency Harriet Cross
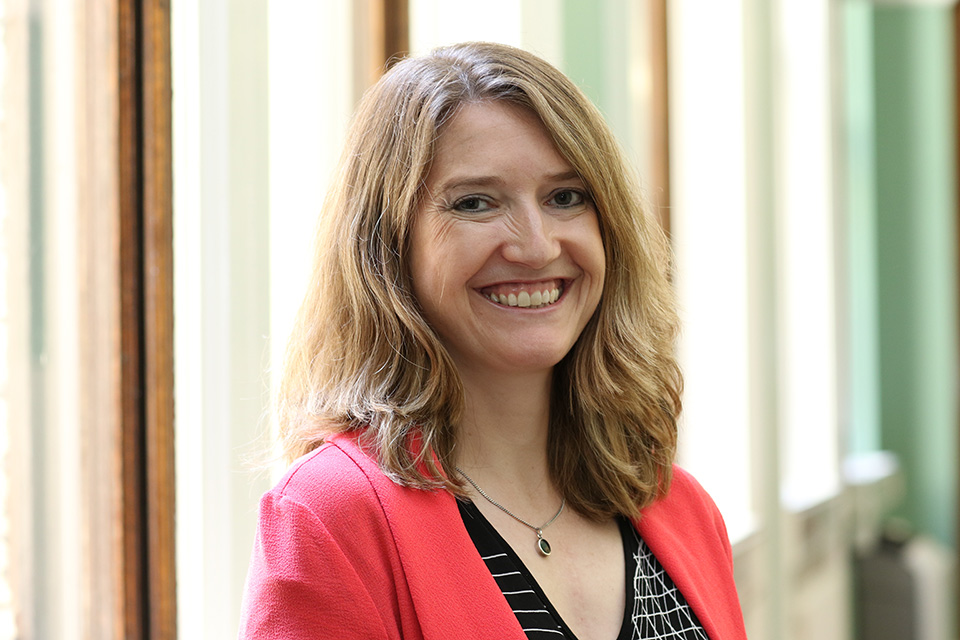
- Cross in 2016

Governor of Montserrat
- Incumbent
- Assumed office 23 April 2025
- Monarch: Charles III
- Premier: Reuben Meade
- Preceded by: Sarah Tucker

Harriet Victoria Cross is a British diplomat who was the British High Commissioner to Trinidad and Tobago from 2020 to 2024. She was appointed to be the Governor of Montserrat in 2025.

== Life ==
She succeeded Sarah Tucker and she began in April 2025. She was High Commissioner to Trinidad and Tobago between 2020 and Dec 2024, Consul-General in Boston, Massachusetts from 2016 to August 2020 and Deputy Ambassador at the British Embassy in Yemen before that. She was the first female High Commissioner to Trinidad and Tobago, the fourth woman to manage the Boston consulate and the first consul since 1972 to represent the United Kingdom outside the European Union. While in Yemen, ongoing conflict there compelled her to organize the evacuation of the Embassy, and she subsequently spent the rest of her posting in Jeddah, Saudi Arabia.

Cross earned a master's degree in International Relations from the Fletcher School of Law & Diplomacy at Tufts University (2019, Global Master of Arts Program (GMAP)), a First Class honours degree from the University of Warwick in Politics with French and an Executive Certificate in Management & Leadership from MIT.

== International posts ==
=== British High Commissioner, Trinidad and Tobago ===
Cross was High Commissioner to Trinidad and Tobago from September 2020 to December 2024. Her tenure began during the Covid pandemic, with two weeks in quarantine. She was against gender-based violence, and she promoted of girls' and women's empowerment.

=== Governor of Montserrat ===
In January 2025, it was announced that Cross had been appointed as Governor of Montserrat, and would be taking up her post in April 2025. She was sworn in on 23 April 2025.

She is the fourth female governor of the island.
