= Andrew Pearce (diplomat) =

Governor of Montserrat from 2018 to 2022

Andrew Pearce OBE
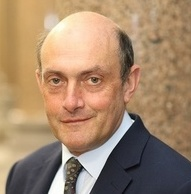

15th Governor of Montserrat
- In office 1 February 2018 – 7 March 2022
- Monarch: Elizabeth II
- Premier: Donaldson Romeo (2018–2019); Easton Taylor-Farrell (2019–2022)
- Preceded by: Elizabeth Carriere
- Succeeded by: Sarah Tucker

Personal details
- Born: 7 October 1960 (age 65)
- Spouse: Pornpun Pearce
- Education: St Catherine's College, Oxford University

Andrew John Pearce OBE (born 7 October 1960) is a British diplomat who served as Governor of Montserrat from 2018 to 2022.

== Early life ==
Andrew John Pearce was born on 7 October 1960 to Edward Peter Pearce and Renee Joyce Pearce. Pearce attended St Catherine's College, Oxford University and graduated with a first class MA in Chemistry (Hons) in 1983.

== Career ==
Pearce worked in scientific research before joining the Foreign and Commonwealth Office (FCO) in 1988. Since 1992, he has held postings in Tel Aviv, Pretoria, Bucharest, Bangkok and Vilnius. He was made an Officer of the Order of the British Empire (OBE) in the 2013 Birthday Honours for his work as head of security for the FCO's Estates and Security Directorate. In 2017, he was made chargé d'affaires of the British embassy in Lithuania.

In December 2017, the FCO announced that Pearce would succeed Elizabeth Carriere as Governor of Montserrat in February 2018.

He stepped down as Governor of Montserrat on March 7, 2022, and was replaced by Sarah Tucker.

== Personal life ==
Pearce married Pornpun Pathumvivatana in 1986. In his free time, Pearce enjoys tennis and gardening.

Government offices
Preceded by Elizabeth Carriere	Governor of Montserrat; 2018–2022	Succeeded by Sarah Tucker
