= Sarah Tucker (diplomat) =

Governor of Montserrat from 2022 to 2025

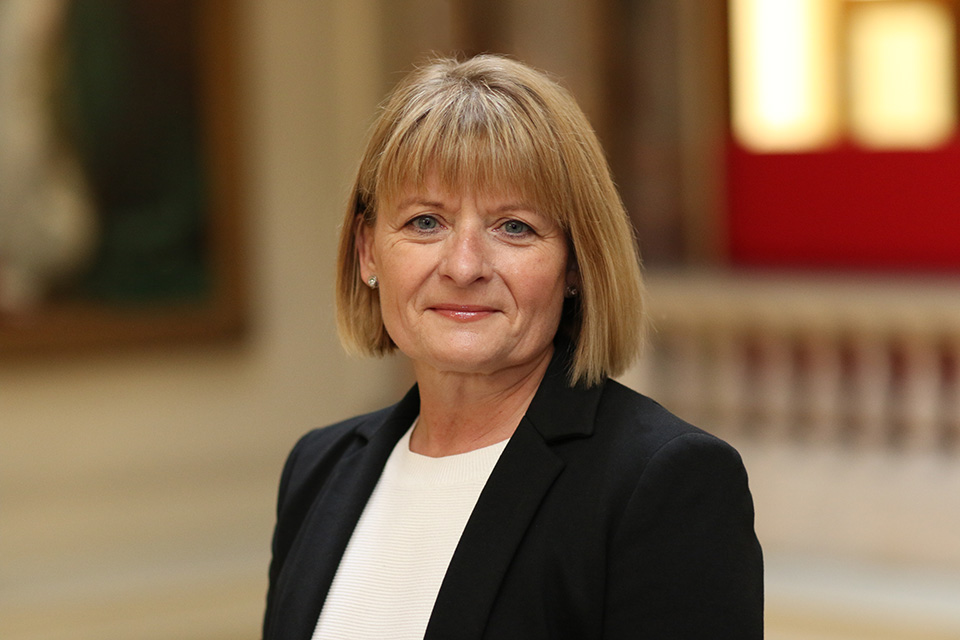

Governor of Montserrat
- In office 6 April 2022 – 8 April 2025
- Monarchs: Elizabeth II; Charles III
- Premier: Easton Taylor-Farrell; Reuben Meade
- Preceded by: Andrew Pearce
- Succeeded by: Harriet Cross

Personal details
- Born: 1968 (age 57–58)

Sarah Georgina Tucker (born 1968) is a British civil servant and diplomat who served as governor of Montserrat from 2022 to 2025.

== Early life ==
Tucker was born in 1968. She is married to Howard John Tucker, and has adult sons.

Tucker worked at Gallaher Group from 1994 to 2007. From 2008 to 2011, she was Director and Owner of Tickling the Trout Ltd.

== Government ==
Tucker first entered government service as a Deputy Commercial Director for the Foreign & Commonwealth Office (FCO) from 2011 to 2016. After taking unpaid leave to become a Director at Pencabe Associates Ltd, she returned to the FCO as Director of Corporate Capability from 2017 to 2020. Following a short stint as FCDO Head of Cruise Repatriation, Tucker became the FCDO Director of Strategy for the British Virgin Islands in 2020. In this position, she worked on the British Virgin Islands 2021 Commission of Inquiry.

Tucker was designated as the new Governor of Montserrat in December 2021, succeeding Andrew Pearce. On 5 April 2022, she arrived with her husband in Montserrat. The following day, she was sworn in as Governor in a two-hour session of the Legislative Assembly of Montserrat held at the Montserrat Cultural Centre in Little Bay. After speeches from the Deputy Governor, the Assembly Speaker, the Premier, and the Opposition Leader, Attorney-General Sheree Jemmotte-Rodney administered the oath of office to Tucker. Subsequently, Tucker formally inspected the Royal Montserrat Police Service, the Royal Montserrat Defence Force, and the Montserrat Secondary School Cadet Corps. At a reception, she met legislators, civil servants, and the Youth Parliament.

Tucker attended an International Librarian Day ceremony held at the Montserrat Public Library on 16 April, and addressed the participants of the 2022 Commonwealth Games Queen's Baton Relay on 26 April. She participated in events marking the Platinum Jubilee of Elizabeth II.

Government offices
Preceded by Andrew Pearce	Governor of Montserrat; 2022–2025	Succeeded by Harriet Cross
