= Governor of Montserrat =

Representative of the British monarch in Montserrat

- Coat of arms of Montserrat

- Flag of the governor of Montserrat

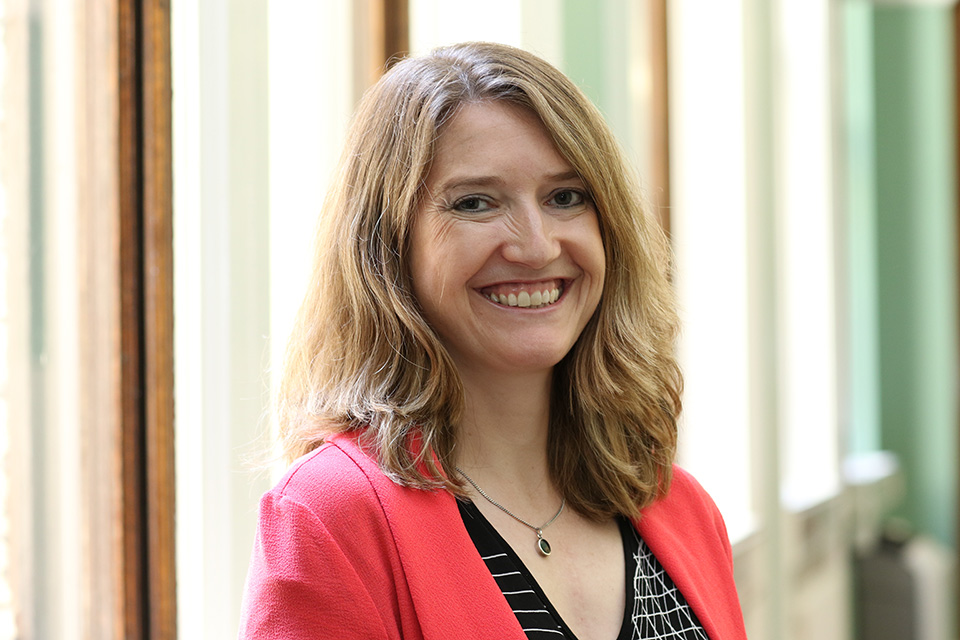
- Incumbent; Harriet Cross since 23 April 2025
- Viceroy
- Residence: Government House, Montserrat
- Appointer: Charles III as King of the United Kingdom
- Term length: At His Majesty's pleasure
- Formation: 1971
- First holder: Willoughby Harry Thompson
- Website: Governor's Office Brades

Standard of the governor of Montserrat until 1999

The governor of Montserrat is the representative of the British monarch in the United Kingdom's overseas territory of Montserrat. The governor is appointed by the monarch on the advice of the British government. The main role of the governor is to appoint the chief minister.

The governor has their own flag in Montserrat, the Union Flag defaced with the territory's coat of arms. The official residence of the governor is Government House, located in Woodlands.

== History ==
In 2003, a petition signed by 200 people in Montserrat, called upon the British government to sack the resident governor, at that time, Tony Longrigg, stating that his policies were ruining the economy of the territory. Longrigg had prevented villa owners from returning to certain areas of the territory threatened by volcanic eruption, a decision he made based on scientific advice provided by the director of the Montserrat Volcano Observatory (MVO) and the Scientific Advisory Committee.

== List of governors of Montserrat ==
- Willoughby Harry Thompson (1971–1974)
- Norman Derek Matthews (1974–1976)
- Gwilym Wyn Jones (1977–1980)
- David Kenneth Hay Dale (1980–1984)
- Arthur Christopher Watson (1985–1987)
- Christopher J. Turner (1987–1990)
- David G. P. Taylor (1990–1993)
- Frank Savage (1993–1997)
- Tony Abbott (1997–2001)
- Howard A. Fergus (2001; acting, 1st time)
- Tony Longrigg (11 April 2001 – 2 April 2004)
- Sir Howard A. Fergus (2004; acting, 2nd time)
- Deborah Barnes Jones (10 May 2004 – 6 July 2007)
- John Skerritt (6 July 2007 – 13 July 2007; acting)
- Sir Howard A. Fergus (13 July 2007 – 27 July 2007; acting, 3rd time)
- Peter Waterworth (27 July 2007 – 3 March 2011)
- Sarita Francis (3 March 2011 – 8 April 2011; acting)
- Adrian Davis (8 April 2011 – 8 July 2015)
- Alric Taylor (8 July 2015 – 5 August 2015; acting)
- Elizabeth Carriere (5 August 2015 – 2 January 2018)
- Lyndell Simpson (2 January 2018 – 1 February 2018; acting)
- Andrew Pearce (1 February 2018 – 7 March 2022)
- Lyndell Simpson (7 March 2022 – 6 April 2022; acting)
- Sarah Tucker (6 April 2022 – 8 April 2025)
- Lindorna Sweeney (8 April 2025 – 23 April 2025; acting)
- Harriet Cross (23 April 2025 – present)
