= Elections in Montserrat =

Map of the polling divisions used for vote counting

Elections in Montserrat take place within the framework of a multi-party democracy and a parliamentary system. The Legislative Assembly is directly elected, and a Chief Minister is selected by the party or coalition with the most seats in the Assembly.

== Electoral history ==
Elections were held in Montserrat in the 19th century, but with a severely limited franchise; in 1837 only 114 of the 7,119 residents of the island were eligible to vote. The partially elected Legislative Assembly dissolved itself in 1866 and was replaced with a wholly appointed body, which remained in place until 1937 when constitutional reforms reintroduced elected members. The reorganised legislature had nine seats; four elected, three held by government officials and two by nominees appointed by the Governor. The first elections in Montserrat in the 20th century took place in the same year.

Universal suffrage was introduced in 1951, and the 1952 elections were the first in which all adults on the island could vote. They saw the Montserrat Labour Party win all five elected seats in the Legislative Council. The MLP subsequently won elections in 1955, 1958, 1961 (when the council was expanded to seven seats) and 1966.

The 1970 elections saw the new Progressive Democratic Party (PDP) win all seven seats. The PDP also won the 1973 elections, but was defeated in 1978 when the People's Liberation Movement (PLM) won all seven seats. The PLM went on to win the 1983 and 1987 elections.

The 1991 elections were won by the National Progressive Party, which won four of the seven seats. The 1996 elections resulted in a hung parliament, with the People's Progressive Alliance (PPA) and Movement for National Reconstruction (MNR) holding two seats, the NPP holding one, and the remaining seats taken by two independents. The island's first coalition government was formed by the MNR, NPP and an independent MP.

A new electoral system was introduced for the 2001 elections as a result of the volcanic eruptions rendering four of the seven constituencies uninhabitable. The seven single-member constituencies were replaced with one nine-member constituency in which voters could vote for nine candidates. The elections were won by the New People's Liberation Movement (NPLM), which took seven of the nine seats. The 2006 elections resulted in another hung parliament, and although the Movement for Change and Prosperity (MCAP) emerged as the largest party with four seats, the NPLM and the Montserrat Democratic Party formed a coalition government together with the sole independent MP. Although the NPLM held three seats and the MDP one, MDP leader Lowell Lewis became Chief Minister.

The 2009 elections were won by the MCAP, which took six of the nine seats. In 2011 the Legislative Council was abolished and replaced by the Legislative Assembly. In the first elections to the new body in 2014, the MCAP was defeated by the new People's Democratic Movement, which won seven seats.

== Electoral system ==
The nine members of the Legislative Assembly are elected for five-year terms in a single constituency in which voters can vote for nine candidates. The island is split into six polling divisions for vote counting.
