= Margaret Rose Kelsick =

Montserratian politician

Member of the Legislative Council
- In office 1961–1966
- Succeeded by: Percival Austin Bramble
- Constituency: Plymouth

Personal details
- Born: Plymouth, Montserrat

Margaret Rose Kelsick was a Montserratian politician. In 1961 she became the first woman to be elected to the Legislative Council.

== Biography ==
Kelsick was born in Plymouth, the daughter of Margaret (née Bladen) and Thomas H. Kelsick. She was educated at Montserrat Secondary School and subsequently worked for the family insurance company, Thomas H. Kelsick Ltd.

The cousin of Eric Kelsick, the leader of the Montserrat Democratic Party, Kelsick was a member of the Montserrat Labour Party and contested the 1958 elections – the first woman to run for a seat on the Legislative Council – but lost to Michael Dyer in the Southern constituency by only three votes. She ran again in 1961 and was elected from the Plymouth constituency, becoming the first woman to take a seat in the Legislative Council. However, she left the party during the term of the council due to disagreements over the appointment of David Fenton as a minister. She subsequently lost her seat in the 1966 elections.

Kelsick became Managing Director of the family company and a member of the Montserrat Chamber of Commerce. She also established a scholarship fund to allow students from poor backgrounds to attend university.
