= Adelina Tuitt =

Montserratian politician

Minister of Health, Education, and Community Services
- In office 23 August 1997 – 1 February 2001
- Chief Minister: David Brandt
- Preceded by: ?
- Succeeded by: ?

Member of the Legislative Council of Montserrat
- In office 11 November 1996 – 2 February 2001
- Preceded by: ?
- Succeeded by: Constituency disestablished
- Constituency: Eastern

Personal details
- Party: MNR; MRP

Adelina E. Tuitt is a Montserratian politician who served in the Legislative Council of Montserrat from 1996 until 2001. She was the territory's Minister of Health, Education, and Community Services, in the wake of the volcanic eruptions of the 1990s, which devastated the southern half of the island. A member of the Movement for National Reconstruction party, Tuitt represented the Eastern constituency.

== Biography ==
In 1993, prior to entering elected office, Adelina Tuitt was the public relations officer for the government of Montserrat. In this position, she advocated for Montserrat, a British Overseas Territory, to distance itself from the United Kingdom by building closer ties with other Caribbean states. She also supported the joining of various regional and international associations, including the Organization of American States; the Food and Agriculture Organization; UNESCO; and "possibly the United Nations", which would precede full independence for the country.

In the 1996 Montserratian general election, Tuitt was elected to the Legislative Council of Montserrat, representing the Eastern constituency as a member of the Movement for National Reconstruction party. She received 189 votes (54.9%) in the single-member constituency. Tuitt was invited into the coalition government of Chief Minister Bertrand Osborne. Osborne resigned the following year in the wake of the island's devastating 1997 volcanic eruption; Tuitt remained in the government of Osborne's successor, David Brandt, and was appointed Minister of Health, Education, and Community Services on 23 August 1997. In this role, Tuitt was responsible for overseeing the remnants and reconstruction of Montserrat's health and housing services in the wake of the disaster, which left the entire southern half of the island permanently uninhabitable. The island's healthcare infrastructure had largely collapsed, with only a single makeshift hospital and limited aid from the British government. As a result, many Montserrat citizens fled to the United Kingdom or neighboring Caribbean nations.

Also tasked with overseeing the construction of new housing, Tuitt led the Montserratian delegation to the 1997 conference of the Caribbean Community (CARICOM). She was a key figure in a plan which created a new village on the island with the aid of CARICOM. Housing units were pre-fabricated in Cuba and brought to Montserrat for installation; in total, the "CARICOM village" consisted of 25 three-bedroom housing units. Construction was completed in October 1999. The year prior, she also met with Clare Short, the British Secretary of State for International Development, regarding the island's issues with health and housing.

By 2000, Tuitt had become a strong critic of Brandt, calling him "too autocratic" and accusing him of having "dictatorial leanings". Much of the dispute stemmed from Brandt's authorization of the construction of a new airport on Montserrat, as the previous airport had been destroyed in the volcanic eruptions; Tuitt alleged that Brandt authorized construction without consulting his ministers. On 1 February 2001, Tuitt, along with communications minister Rupert Weekes, resigned from their ministerial posts. Their resignations led to the collapse of Brandt's government, which only had a one-seat majority in the seven-seat legislative council, forcing an early general election that saw Brandt's government defeated. Tuitt left office at the end of her term, the day after her ministerial resignation.

After leaving the legislature, Tuitt remained politically active. In 2009, she became the president of the Montserrat Reform Party, and she was a candidate for speaker of the new Legislative Assembly of Montserrat following the 2014 election. In 2018, Tuitt advocated for the reformation of the legislature, specifically arguing against the use of a single multi-member constituency, which she claimed were not representative of the voting bloc; prior to the 2001 election, the country used single-member constituencies, though this was changed due to the volcanic eruptions depopulating four of the seven legislative constituencies. Tuitt ran for the legislative assembly in the 2019 election, but was defeated, receiving 248 votes and placing twenty-second out of twenty-four candidates. In September 2022, she gave a speech at the Montserrat Secondary School.
