= Margaret Dyer-Howe =

Montserratian politician and businesswoman (1941–2019)

Member of Legislative Assembly of Montserrat
- Minister: Minister for Education and Social Affairs
- Constituency: Southern
- Minister: Minister for Trade, Agriculture, Lands, Housing and the Environment
- Minister: Minister of Finance

Personal details
- Born: Margaret Annie Corbett; 18 November 1941
- Died: 6 April 2019 (aged 77)
- Party: New People's Liberation Movement; Montserrat Labour Party
- Spouse(s): Michael Dyer, m. 1964

Margaret Annie Dyer-Howe (née Corbett; 18 November 1941 – 6 April 2019) was a Montserratian politician and businesswoman, who was the second woman to be appointed as a government minister in the Legislative Assembly of Montserrat. She held a number of ministries during her two periods as an elected representative, including as Minister for Education and Social Affairs, Minister for Trade, Agriculture, Lands, Housing and the Environment and Minister of Finance. She also co-founded the Montserrat Labour Party.

== Biography ==
Margaret Corbett was born 18 November 1941 and grew up in St Patrick's. She attended St. Augustine School in Plymouth, and subsequently attended secretarial college in the USA. In 1964, she married politician Michael Dyer, who died in 1974.

In 1979, she was elected as Southern district member of the Legislative Assembly of Montserrat, representing the New People's Liberation Movement (NPLM), after a by-election in which she was elected to the seat previously held by her husband. During this period she campaigned against the legalisation of abortion. She was re-elected in 1983 and was appointed Minister for Education and Social Affairs; she was the second woman to be appointed as a minister in Montserrat (the first woman to be appointed minister having been Mary Rose Tuitt). In 1984, she married Robert Howe.

After she lost her seat in the 1987 general election, she was recruited by Montserrat Water Authority. During the same period, she and her husband established Howe's Enterprises, a business producing mineral water and condiments.

In the 2001 Montserratian general election, Dyer-Howe was re-elected to the Legislative Council. She was appointed as Minister for Trade, Agriculture, Lands, Housing and the Environment during 2001, and as Minister of Finance from 2001 to 2002. In 2005, she left the NPLM and in advance of the 2009 Montserratian general election, Dyer-Howe co-founded the Montserrat Labour Party with Idabelle Meade and Chedmond Browne. However, she was not re-elected.

Dyer-Howe died on 6 April 2019. After her funeral mass on 10 May 2019, her coffin was accompanied by the band of the Montserrat Defense Force, to Lookout Public Cemetery, where she was buried. The day of her funeral was declared a national holiday in her honour.

== Awards ==
- Montserrat Order of Excellence (2018)
- Bank of Montserrat - Montserrat Icon (2010)
