= 1970 Montserratian general election =

General elections were held in Montserrat on 15 December 1970. The result was a victory for the Progressive Democratic Party (PDP), which won all seven seats in the Legislative Council, whilst the Montserrat Labour Party (MLP), which had won every election since the introduction of universal suffrage in 1951, lost all four of its seats. PDP leader Percival Austin Bramble became Chief Minister, replacing his father and MLP leader, William Henry Bramble.

== Background ==
Universal suffrage was introduced in Montserrat in 1951, and the first elections under it were held the following year, with the MLP winning all five seats. The MLP went on to win elections in 1955, 1958, 1961 and 1966. Party leader William Henry Bramble became Chief Minister in 1960 when the new constitution introduced the ministerial system of government.

== Campaign ==
A total of 16 candidates contested the elections; both the PDP and MLP nominated candidates for all seven seats, with two independents also running.

The elections were the first occasion on which the MLP faced serious opposition. PDP leader Percival Austin Bramble had previously been a member of the MLP and was elected to the Legislative Council as an MLP candidate in the 1966 elections. However, he subsequently broke away to form the PDP as a result of controversy over the number of holiday and retirement homes being built on the island.

== Results ==
| Party | Votes | % | Seats | +/– |
|---|---|---|---|---|
| Progressive Democratic Party | 2,515 | 64.45 | 7 | New |
| Montserrat Labour Party | 1,183 | 30.32 | 0 | –4 |
| Independents | 204 | 5.23 | 0 | –1 |
| Total | 3,902 | 100.00 | 7 | 0 |
| Valid votes | 3,902 | 96.97 | | |
| Invalid/blank votes | 122 | 3.03 | | |
| Total votes | 4,024 | 100.00 | | |
| Registered voters/turnout | 5,030 | 80.00 | | |
Source: Caribbean Elections

=== Elected MPs ===
| Constituency | Elected MP | Party |
|---|---|---|
| Central | E Dyer | Progressive Democratic Party |
| Eastern | W H Ryan | Progressive Democratic Party |
| North-Western | John Osborne | Progressive Democratic Party |
| Northern | J J Weekes | Progressive Democratic Party |
| Plymouth | Percival Austin Bramble | Progressive Democratic Party |
| Southern | Mary Rose Tuitt | Progressive Democratic Party |
| Windward | J S Dublin | Progressive Democratic Party |

== Aftermath ==
Following the elections, Percival Austin Bramble formed a government, including the appointment of John Osborne as Minister of Agriculture.
