= William Henry Bramble =

Chief Minister of Montserrat (1901–1988)

- Born: 8 October 1901
- Died: 17 October 1988 (aged 87)
- Occupation(s): Union leader and political party leader
- Spouse: Ann Daly
- Children: 5

William Henry Bramble (8 October 1901 – 17 October 1988), also known as Willy B, was a union leader and a political-party leader from Montserrat; from his Montserrat Labour Party, he was the first Chief Minister of the territory, serving from January 1960 to December 1970.

Owing to his social compromise for the poor and political action, Bramble is generally regarded as a "national hero", and the former national airport of Montserrat had been named after him until it was destroyed by the 1997 eruption of the Soufrière Hills volcano.

== Early life ==
William Bramble was the son of J. T. Allen, a famous social activist, and Mary Ryan, a conventional lower-class woman. William had started primary school, yet he was economically unable to finish it. It was the mother who mostly took care of him during those early years; William worked the soil of their poor farm, while learning for trade activities as well.

By the 1920s, William Bramble had joined the Seventh-day Adventist Church, initially as an enthusiastic member, then with a waning participation. In those years, he lived off peddling religious books round Montserrat and Dominica. The British colonial office encouraged lime cultivation on Montserrat in the late 1800s. As demand for the product increased the British established lime farms on Dominica in the early 1900s for which they hired labour from Montserrat and encouraged settlement.

In 1930, Bramble married Ann Daly, a strict Adventist instead. They begot five children (P. Austin, Doris, Laurel, Howell, and Olga), of whom the oldest would get into politics as well. For supporting his large family, Bramble had forcibly to start further economic activities; he acquired a small boat and smuggled between the island nations of the Leeward Islands: animals, cooking oil, and vegetables of Montserrat, and salt of Anguilla.

== Union and party leader ==
In his travels, Bramble became acquainted with the regional efforts for unionism, although he would earnestly start involvement in 1951, when joining the incipient Montserrat Trades and Labor Union (MTLU), in the years of its most virulent actions. He challenged Robert Griffith for leadership of the organisation and was backed by the influential teacher and unionist, Ellen Peters, who saw him as a man of action with a viable plan for development. Once Bramble gained leadership of the MTLU, he used it as a springboard to propel him into the political arena.

Bramble became a local leader, against the alleged economic oppression of the planter owners and the political rulers; reportedly, by then the agricultural wages were well below the level of subsistence. Hence, Bramble adopted such causes, particularly organising periodic strike actions; in a speech for the 1952 elections, he stated: "Listen to me, you landless people, you people, the industrial machinery of this country, arise, and throw off the yoke that binds you like slaves to the Wade Plantation."

=== 1952: winning the free elections ===
Originally, William Bramble had been unable to vote in Montserrat, never fulfilling the requirements of property and income for enfranchisement. In 1952, the country allowed the universal adult suffrage for the first time, and then Bramble capitalised it, forging his own political power since then. Bramble actively participated in the 1952 elections, as the MTLU formed the Montserrat Labour Party, which won all five seats in the Legislative Council of Montserrat. Bramble would eventually take the reins of the party. The party went on to win the 1955 and 1958 elections.

Bramble found appreciation and support nationally and abroad including England; even the rivalling popular leaders joined the most pragmatic Bramble in his causes against social oppression. However, in 1958 the Malone Commission of Inquiry, which attended labour disputes, accused Bramble, as he would have been attempting just to gain political power for himself through his political actions.

During his entire political career from 1952 to 1970, Bramble would win five general elections, until being defeated by Eustace Dyer. Additionally, in 1958 Bramble won the elections for representative of the short lived Federal Parliament of the West Indies Federation.

=== Regional policies ===
Since early in his career, calls for independence were in vogue among British Caribbean activists during those years. Instead, Bramble preferred the conventional financial support of a British colony, manifesting doubts that the so tiny Montserrat might survive as an independent territory; to share the government with the royal authorities it wasn't a practical problem for the national development.

== Chief Minister ==
=== National development ===
Bramble was invested as the first Chief Minister of Montserrat in 1960 after constitutional changes introduced ministerial government; by then the cotton production was in a decline, as the workers were rather emigrating to United Kingdom. Coping with this situation, he formulated an economic project, with three objectives: the diversification of the exploitation of the rich soil of the country for exporting regionally, the development of the industry of tourism, and the development of a strong offshore banking through taxation exemption.

For the development of the tourism, in 1961, Bramble founded the Montserrat Real State Company, which built about 100 buildings for the foreign tourism. This effectively boosted the national income, forging a new, positive character of the nation which lasted until the eruption of the Soufriere Hills, in the 1990s with the massive destruction of the country. Indeed, until such nefarious event Bramble was regarded as the father of the modern Montserrat.

Bramble also supported the establishment of the powerful Radio Antilles; Bramble had to insist for convincing the British authorities for it, and the powerful station finally started operating in 1963, successfully broadcasting news for the whole Caribbean region. Also for 1963, Bramble managed negotiating with the British government, so the 12,000 inhabitants of Montserrat got electric supply with affordable fees for the first time; Bramble had pledged the regular acquisition in advance of a determined quote of energy, and so the local plant was granted.

=== Social reforms ===
This occurred with radical social reforms particularly for the poor people, as both his party and his trade union worked almost as a single entity.

In particular, Bramble interceded with the owners of the Wade plantation company, for the development of housing for their workers; initially just within some parcels of that company, then throughout Montserrat, both the employers and their workers helped erecting new neighbourhoods. This directly ensued in the formation of a middle class, whose residences have reportedly been of the best ones in Caribbean region.

By 1957, Bramble was expressing concern about the countryside children of Montserrat, whose broad majority was illiterate; by 1969, he instead stated that by his administration all those children were already attending school.

=== Politics ===
During Bramble's tenure, the small Progressive Labour Party functioned as opposition, although it would never pose much hindrance to the official policies. The MLP won elections comfortably in 1961 and 1966. It was by 1970 that Bramble and his Montserrat Labour Party faced actual political troubles. Boosting the tourism industry, Bramble was allegedly too enthusiastic for the building of new establishments either for vacationing or retirement, but the Progressive Democratic Party of his son P. Austin Bramble was opposed to it. People agreed with the latter, providing a landslide triumph in the 1970 elections, and so William Henry Bramble lost the Chief Minister's office, while his MLP was left without representatives in the Legislative Council.

Still, Bramble underwent some criticism, particularly about his authoritarian demeanor among his intimates. Another source of controversy were the investments of tourism, which allegedly would have removed lands from agricultural projects. Another setback was due to the Canadian Leeward Islands Company Limited, which settled in 1960, eventually exploiting the tomato production almost without economic reward for the locals.

== Death ==
William Bramble died in 1988; he was the first national figure to have a state funeral and he has the honour of being Montserrat's first National Hero. In 1995, the international airport of Montserrat was renamed after him.

Preceded by –	Chief Minister of Montserrat; 1960–1970	Succeeded by Percival Austin Bramble
