= National Development Party (Montserrat) =

Political party

The National Development Party (NDP) was a conservative political party in Montserrat led by Bertrand Osborne.

== History ==
The NDP was established in December 1984, and launched a newspaper, the Montserrat Reporter the following year. In the 1987 general elections it won two seats in the Legislative Council. In the 1991 elections the party retained both seats.

By the 1996 elections Osborne was leader of the new Movement for National Reconstruction.
