= Montserrat Workers' Progressive Party =

The Montserrat Workers' Progressive Party (MWPP) was a political party in Montserrat, led by John Osborne.

== History ==
The party contested the 1966 elections, nominating five candidates for the seven seats. It won one seat, taken by Osborne in the North-Western constituency. By the 1970 elections Osborne was a member of the Progressive Democratic Party.
