= Thomas Mylius Savage English =

British naturalist (1868–1949)

- Born: 22 March 1868; Hawley, Kent
- Died: 4 June 1949 (aged 81); Plymouth, Montserrat
- Occupation(s): Postmaster, Administrator and Naturalist
- Known for: English's Crater, Montserrat

Thomas Mylius Savage English (22 March 1868 – 4 June 1949) was a British naturalist, who is notable for having identified the volcanic crater of the Soufrière Hills Volcano, Montserrat now known as English's Crater.

== Early life ==
English was born in Hawley, Kent. He was the son of Lieutenant Colonel Thomas English, R.E. (14 March 1844–1935) and Clara Jane Savage (born in Port Louis, Mauritius in 1843). He had two siblings, Henry Boscawen de Heyn English (1869–1883), and Douglas Arthur Watkins English (1870–1939). He was a pupil at Charterhouse School from 1881 to 1884.

== Career ==
After training at the Royal Military College, English joined the Bedfordshire Regiment, and was appointed Second Lieutenant in September 1887. In March 1888, he joined the Cameronians (Scottish Rifles) as Second Lieutenant. He retired from military service in 1889.

In July 1894, he registered a patent for an 'Apparatus for Utilising the Force of Waves to Produce Motive Power'.

== Cayman Islands ==
From 1910 - 1914, Thomas English lived on Grand Cayman, where he was a postmaster and Tutor to the daughter of Commissioner of the Cayman Islands. While on Grand Cayman, English gathered systematic information about the flora and fauna of the island. He engaged in correspondence with Arthur William Hill, Assistant Director, and Sir David Prain, Director of the Royal Botanic Gardens at Kew about plant collecting, and sent them specimens of various seeds and wild plants from Grand Cayman, either for the Kew Herbarium, or for further identification. 'English Sound', a small lagoon near North Sound on Grand Cayman is named after him. This was one location where English made observations. It is also the type locality of the Western Pygmy Blue (Grand Cayman) Butterfly. English published his various observations on the natural history of the Cayman islands in a number of places, including a discussion of the arrival of invasive species by air and sea and reports on the birds of the Cayman islands.

== Montserrat ==
In August 1919, Thomas English moved to Montserrat, to take up a role as a Colonial Administrator. He worked on Montserrat for the rest of his career. During the 1920's Thomas English transcribed a number of documents that he found in the Court House in Plymouth, and used them to tell the history of Montserrat. His report, titled 'Records of Montserrat' was completed in 1930 in transcript. While it was widely cited at the time, it was not formally published, and there are no accessible digital copies. The original is held in the Montserrat National Trust library.

The entomologist Richard Blackwelder called on English in his house in Montserrat in 1936. He describes English as 'rather elderly with a bushy white beard', living in a 'little wooden house with burlap walls, dirt floor etc., just opposite the Botanic Gardens'. To Blackwelder's disappointment, English was interested in birds rather than water-beetles, and he received two birds nests and some eggs from English for the US National Museum of Natural History, which are still in their collections.

In the 1930's, English's work played an important role in discussions around the volcanic nature of the Soufrière Hills, after a series of damaging earthquakes struck the island. He had pointed out the existence of a horse-shoe shaped crater, East of the highest point in the island, Chances Peak. Thomas English inferred that this was the youngest crater of the volcano, and the feature became known as English's Crater. When the British geologist Archie MacGregor visited Montserrat in 1936 to report on the geology of Montserrat, he acknowledged the value of English's geological notes in the 'Records of Montserrat', and noted that English was the first to recognise the presence of a young crater on the island. MacGregor's report, published in 1936, was the first publication to formally name English's Crater, and MacGregor's geological map published in 1938 was the first map to show this feature. American volcanologist Frank Perret also acknowledged English's work, in his report of the 1930's seismic crisis. Perret describes Thomas English as an 'amateur scientist', but notes that he carefully recorded the timings of earthquake shocks on the island of Montserrat at the start of the seismic crisis in 1934. English's interpretation was validated many years later, when the volcanic eruption of the Soufrière Hills Volcano began in July 1995, within the crater that he had described, and which was named for him.

== Family ==
Thomas English married Emily Margaret Sale on 30 April 1901 in St Peter's Church, St Leonards, Tasmania. They had two children, Patrick (born 13 May 1902) and Sylvia. Thomas English died at Dagenham, Plymouth, St Antony, Montserrat in June 1949. His probate records state that he left effects to the value of £341 in England.
