= Movement for National Reconstruction =

Political Party in Montserrat

The Movement for National Reconstruction (MNR) was a political party in Montserrat led by Bertrand Osborne.

== History ==
Osborne had previously been leader of the National Development Party, which won a single seat in the 1991 elections. However, by the 1996 elections he had established the MNR.

In the elections the party won two of the seven seats in the Legislative Council, with Osborne and Adelina Tuitt representing the party in the council. Although the People's Progressive Alliance (PPA) had received the most votes, the MNR formed a coalition government with the National Progressive Party and an independent MP, with Osborne as Chief Minister.

In 2001 the party merged with the PPA to create the New People's Liberation Movement prior to the elections that year.
