= 1983 Montserratian general election =

General elections were held in Montserrat in February 1983. The result was a victory for the People's Liberation Movement (PLM), which won five of the seven seats in the Legislative Council. PLM leader John Osborne remained Chief Minister.

== Campaign ==
A total of 22 candidates contested the elections; the PLM and the Progressive Democratic Party both nominated seven, the United National Front nominated four, with the other four candidates running as independents, three of which contested the Northern constituency.

== Results ==
Party	Votes	%	Seats	+/–
People's Liberation Movement	2,517	55.03	5	–2
Progressive Democratic Party	1,587	34.70	2	+2
United National Front	251	5.49	0	New
Independents	219	4.79	0	0
Total	4,574	100.00	7	0
Valid votes	4,574	98.62		
Invalid/blank votes	64	1.38		
Total votes	4,638	100.00		
Registered voters/turnout	6,213	74.65		
Source: Emmanuel

=== Elected MPs ===
Constituency	Elected MP	Party
Central	E Dyer	Progressive Democratic Party
Eastern	N Tuitt	People's Liberation Movement
North-Western	John Osborne	People's Liberation Movement
Northern	J B Chalmers	People's Liberation Movement
Plymouth	F Margetson	People's Liberation Movement
Southern	Percival Austin Bramble	Progressive Democratic Party
Windward	David Brandt	People's Liberation Movement
