= Tuitt =

Tuitt is a surname. Notable people with the surname include:

- Adelina Tuitt, Montserratian politician
- Darren Tuitt (born 1980), Montserratian athlete
- Horace Tuitt (born 1954), Trinidad and Tobago sprinter
- Mary Rose Tuitt (1930–2005), Montserratian educator
- Stephon Tuitt (born 1993), American football player
