= Montserrat United Workers' Movement =

Defunct political party in Montserrat

The Montserrat United Workers' Movement (MWUM) was a political party in Montserrat led by Kenneth Allen.

== History ==
The party was established in 1961. In the elections later that year it won two of the seven seats in the Legislative Council; Allen lost in the Plymouth constituency, but M Dyer won in Southern and J W Allen won in Northern. However, it did not contest any further elections.
