= Flight 292 =

Flight 292 may refer to:

- Pan Am Flight 292, a Boeing 707-100 which flew into Chances Peak on 17 September 1965, with no survivors
- JetBlue Flight 292, an Airbus A320-200 whose nose landing gear was jammed at an abnormal position during final approach on 21 September 2005; everyone on board evacuated the aircraft and survived
- Adam Air Flight 292, a Boeing 737-400 which skidded off the runway while landing at Batam on 10 March 2008; everyone survived, however, two of the passengers needed medical attention due to panic
