= 1973 Montserratian general election =

Early general elections were held in Montserrat on 20 September 1973. The result was a victory for the Progressive Democratic Party (PDP), which won five of the seven seats in the Legislative Council. PDP leader Percival Austin Bramble remained Chief Minister.

== Background ==
Following the 1970 elections, the next elections were not due until March 1976. However, Bramble asked the Governor to dissolve the Legislative Council on 7 August, resulting in early elections. Bramble claimed that he required a new mandate to combat racism in the island's education system.

== Results ==
Party	Votes	%	Seats	+/–
Progressive Democratic Party	2,279	65.24	5	–2
Independents	1,214	34.76	2	+2
Total	3,493	100.00	7	0
Valid votes	3,493	98.42		
Invalid/blank votes	56	1.58		
Total votes	3,549	100.00		
Registered voters/turnout	5,051	70.26		
Source: Emmanuel
