= 1943 Montserratian general election =

Election in Montserrat

General elections were held in Montserrat in 1943 to elect members of the Legislative Council.

== Electoral system ==
The Legislative Council had nine seats; four elected, three held by government officials and two by nominees appointed by the Governor.

== Results ==
Amongst the four elected members was Robert William Griffith, the first MLC not from the merchant and planter class.
