= Saint Anthony Parish, Montserrat =

Parish in Montserrat

Coordinates: 16°42′30″N 62°12′00″W

The parishes of Montserrat: Saint Anthony is shown in blue/cyan

Saint Anthony is one of Montserrat's three administrative parishes. The parish is located on the south of the island.

== History ==
Prior to 1995, the parish was highly populated, with the capital, Plymouth, being situated on the west coast.

The Soufrière Hills volcano remained dormant until 18 July 1995, when the eruption resulted in the destruction of the entire parish and the neighboring Saint Georges Parish. Many of the parishes' towns and villages, including Plymouth, became ghost towns.

== Former settlements ==
- Amersham
- Elberton
- Plymouth
- Weekes
