= Chances Peak =

Summit on Montserrat

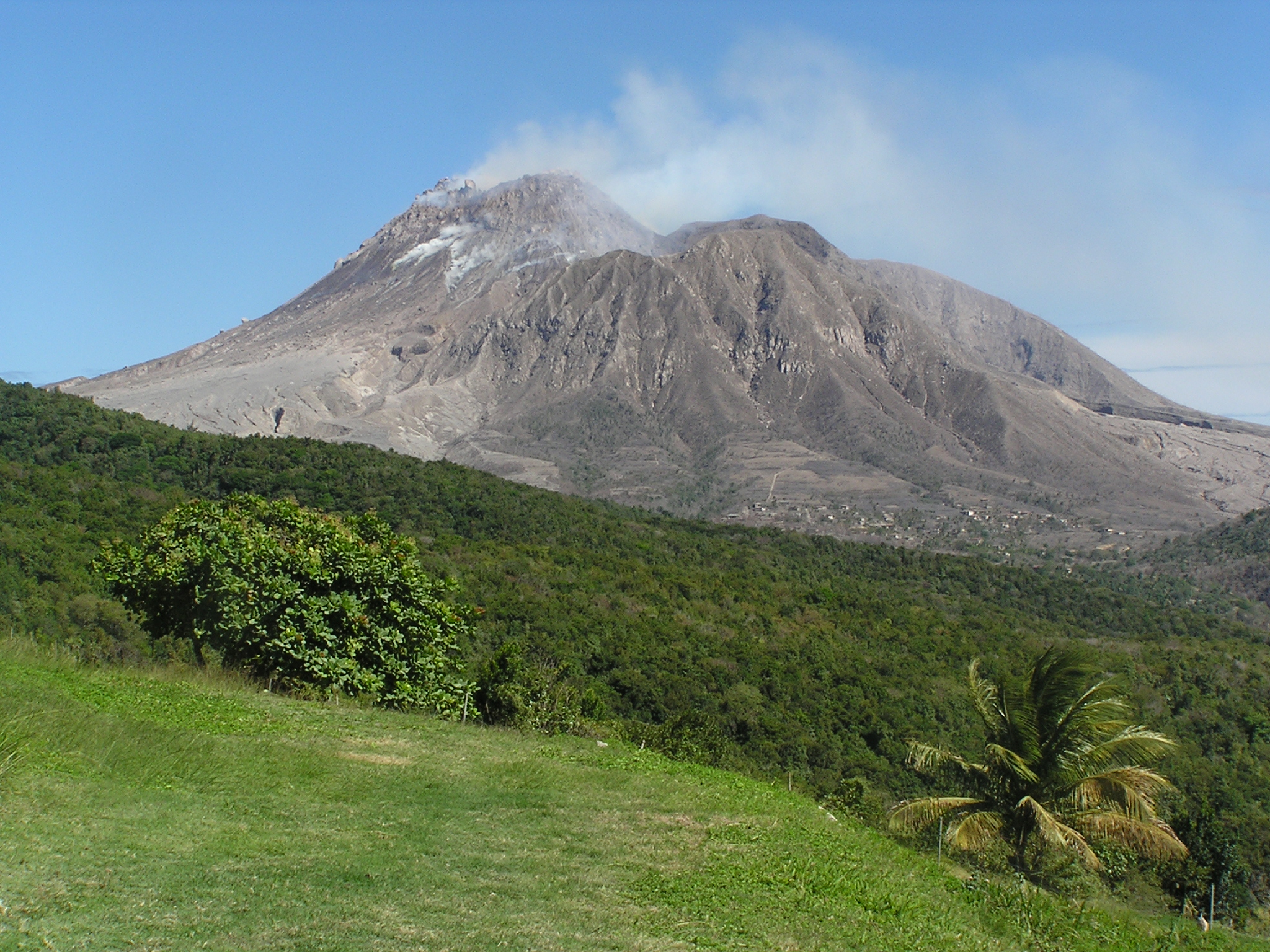

Highest point
- Elevation: 915 m (3,002 ft) (Note: This elevation is for Chance's Peak, the traditional high point. However the lava dome in English's Crater is currently (2006) estimated at over 930 metres (3,051 ft) : see The CIA World Factbook on Montserrat.)
- Prominence: 915 m (3,002 ft)
- Coordinates: 16°42′40″N 62°10′38″W

Geography
- Location within Montserrat
- Location: Montserrat, Caribbean
- Country: Montserrat

Geology
- Mountain type: Stratovolcano
- Last eruption: January 3, 2009

Chances Peak is a summit of the active complex stratovolcano named Soufrière Hills, the youngest volcanic complex on the island of Montserrat, a British overseas territory located in the Caribbean Sea. It was the highest point on the island until the mid-1990s, when fluctuating volcanic domes during the 1995–1999 Soufrière Hills eruptions eclipsed the peak in height. The Soufriere Hills volcano is on a destructive plate margin, and is part of the Eastern Caribbean Volcanic Arc. This volcanic arc lies on the Caribbean plate, and was formed by subduction of the North American Plate beneath it.

On 17 September 1965, a Boeing 707 aircraft operating as Pan Am Flight 292 flew into Chances Peak near the summit and was destroyed, killing the 30 people on board.

== English's Crater ==
In 1936, the British geologist Archie MacGregor carried out geological fieldwork across Montserrat, as a part of a Royal Society expedition in response to an ongoing seismic crisis. MacGregor noted that the peak of what he called Chance's Mountain formed the highest point on the island (3002 feet, at that time). Following discussions with a local resident, Thomas Savage English, MacGregor's mapping confirmed that the region to the East of Chance's Peak summit was a breached volcanic crater. MacGregor called this 'English's Crater', and identified this structure on the geological map which accompanied his report. MacGregor also confirmed English's interpretation, that English's Crater contained the volcanic plug or remnants of an old volcanic dome, called Castle Peak or Castles Peak. The first recorded eruption of Montserrat of the modern era began within English's Crater, in July 1995.

== See also ==
- Geography of Montserrat
- List of volcanoes in Montserrat
