= Ellen Dolly Peters =

Montserratian teacher and trade unionist

Ellen Dolly Peters BEM
- Born: Ellen Dolly; 18 November 1894; St. Patrick's, Montserrat, British Leeward Islands
- Died: 1995 (aged 100–101)
- Other names: Ellen Peters
- Occupations: teacher, trade unionist
- Years active: 1907–1968

Ellen Dolly Peters, BEM (18 November 1894 – 1995) was an Afro-Montserratian teacher and trade unionist. Outspoken in her activism for improved conditions for workers, she was instrumental in the rise of William Bramble's political career and earned the title "king maker". For her contributions to labor, she was awarded the British Empire Medal and was awarded the Pro Ecclesia et Pontifice for her teaching and service to the Catholic Church.

== Early life ==
Ellen Dolly was born on 18 November 1894 in the now abandoned village of St. Patrick's, on the volcanic island of Montserrat, which at the time was a part of the British Leeward Islands, to Rosanna (née O’Garro) and Levons Elias Dolly. At the age of thirteen, she moved to the Gages estate and began teaching at St. Augustine School. In 1912, Dolly married Abraham Peters and the couple moved to the village of Kinsale. While she continued to teach, she became involved in debating societies.

== Activist ==
In the 1940s, Peters began speaking out against child labor, unsanitary living conditions, and racism. By 1946, when the Montserrat Trades and Labour Union (MTLU) was formed, she joined the union and used her skill with debate to emphasize how the labor practices of the plantocracy abused the sharecroppers and workers on the island. Unlike many who were afraid to confront the economic ruling class, Peters relentlessly pursued fair labor practices and pay for workers and improvement in the conditions under which they worked.

Recognizing that her outspokenness and gender would preclude her from running for public office, Peters put her considerable influence behind William Bramble, who would become Montserrat's first Chief Minister, when Bramble challenged then leader of the organization, Robert Griffith in 1951. Peters sided with Bramble, as she saw Bramble as a man of action with a plan to propel the country forward and deal with class inequalities. Once Bramble attained leadership in the MTLU, he used the position as a springboard to political office and began vying for public office in 1952.

Peters campaigned hard for Bramble to be elected and was known to have written many of his most notable speeches. When he won the election, Peters was acclaimed as the "king maker" and in 1954 was promoted to general secretary of the MTLU. She served in that capacity until her retirement in 1968. When she retired, Peters began working as a youth counsellor for the Social League of Catholic Women. In 1980, she was honored with the Order of Merit from the Montserrat Allied Workers' Union. In 1983, Peters received the British Empire Medal for her work as a trade unionist and the following year, was honored with the Pro Ecclesia et Pontifice for her services as a teacher and work for the church.

== Death and legacy ==
Peters died in 1995, the year that the Soufrière Hills volcano became active again. She is remembered as a champion of labor in Montserrat and is featured in an exhibit honoring politicians and organizers who played a crucial role in the development of the country at the National Museum, along with Griffith and Bramble.
