= People's Progressive Alliance =

People's Progressive Alliance may refer to:

- People's Progressive Alliance (Mauritania), a political party in Mauritania
- People's Progressive Alliance (Montserrat), a defunct political party in Montserrat
- People's Progressive Alliance (Sint Maarten), a defunct political party in Sint Maarten
