= People's Progressive Alliance (Montserrat) =

The People's Progressive Alliance (PPA) was a political party in Montserrat led by John Osborne.

== History ==
The PPA was created in 1996 as a successor to the People's Liberation Movement, which had been formed by Osborne in 1973. Although it received the most votes in the November 1996 elections, it won only two of the seven seats in the Legislative Council, and a coalition government was formed by the Movement for National Reconstruction (MNR) and the National Progressive Party.

In 2001 the party merged with the MNR to create the New People's Liberation Movement prior to the elections that year.
