= National Progressive Party (Montserrat) =

The National Progressive Party (NPP) was a political party in the British Overseas Territory of Montserrat led by Reuben Meade.

== History ==
The NPP was established in 1991. In the elections later that year it won four of the seven seats in the Legislative Council, resulting in Meade becoming Chief Minister.

The 1996 elections saw the party reduced to a single seat. It subsequently joined a coalition government with the Movement for National Reconstruction (MNR) and an independent MP, with MNR leader Bertrand Osborne becoming Chief Minister.

The NPP won two seats in the 2001 elections, in which the New People's Liberation Movement won the remaining seven seats in an enlarged National Assembly. The party was subsequently dissolved in 2005, when Meade formed the Movement for Change and Prosperity.
