= Progressive Democratic Party (Montserrat) =

The Progressive Democratic Party (PDP) was a political party in Montserrat.

== History ==
The party was established in 1970 by Percival Austin Bramble, son of Chief Minister and leader of the Montserrat Labour Party (MLP) William Henry Bramble. Percival had previously been a member of the MLP and was elected to the Legislative Council as an MLP candidate in the 1966 elections. However, he subsequently broke away to form the PDP as a result of controversy over the number of holiday and retirement homes being built on the island.

The 1970 elections were the first occasion on which the MLP had faced serious opposition, and saw the PDP win all seven seats, leaving the MLP without parliamentary representation. Percival Austin Bramble became Chief Minister.

The PDP subsequently won five of the seven seats in the 1973 elections, but were defeated in the 1978 elections, when the People's Liberation Movement formed by former PDP minister John Osborne won all seven seats.

The PDP contested the 1983 elections, winning two seats in the Legislative Council. It was reduced to one seat in the 1987 elections, and did not contest any further elections.
