= 1991 Montserratian general election =

General elections were held in Montserrat on 8 October 1991. The result was a victory for the National Progressive Party (NPP), which won four of the seven seats in the Legislative Council. NPP leader Reuben Meade became Chief Minister.

== Background ==
The People's Liberation Movement (PLM) had won the 1987 elections, taking four of the seven seats in the Legislative Council. However, Minister of Communications Benjamin Chalmers left the party over corruption allegations, meaning it lost its majority. As a result, early elections were called.

== Campaign ==
A total of 26 candidates contested the elections, more than ever before. The NPP nominated seven candidates, the National Development Party six, and the PLM four. The remaining nine candidates ran as independents.

== Results ==
Party	Votes	%	Seats	+/–
National Progressive Party	2,152	42.74	4	New
National Development Party	1,421	28.22	2	0
People's Liberation Movement	820	16.29	0	–4
Independents	642	12.75	1	+1
Total	5,035	100.00	7	0
Valid votes	5,035	96.23		
Invalid/blank votes	197	3.77		
Total votes	5,232	100.00		
Registered voters/turnout	7,282	71.85		
Source: Emmanuel
