= Weekes, Montserrat =

Weekes
- Abandoned village
- Map showing location of Weekes
- Coordinates: 16°43′50.30″N 62°12′54.95″W
- Country: United Kingdom
- Overseas Territory: Montserrat

Area
  - Land: 0.40 sq mi (1.04 km^{2})
- Elevation: 374 ft (114 m)

Weekes is a small, abandoned village in a valley between Garibaldi Hill and Richmond Hill, in St Anthony Parish of Montserrat. As the crow flies, it is 2.46 kilometres (1.53 mi) from Plymouth - the ruined capital of Montserrat. It is abandoned because it lies in the 'uninhabitable zone' surrounding the Soufrière Hills volcano after the 1997 eruption of Chances Peak.
