= 1996 Montserratian general election =

General election to the Montserrat Legislative Assembly

- 11 November 1996

All 7 seats in the Legislative Assembly 4 seats needed for a majority
	First party	Second party	Third party
Leader	John Osborne	Bertrand Osborne	Reuben Meade
Party	PPA	MNR	NPP
Leader's seat	Northwestern	Southern	Central
Last election	–	–	4 seats, 42.7%
Seats won	2	2	1
Seat change	New	New	▼3
Popular vote	1,472	930	809
Percentage	35.0%	22.1%	19.2%
Swing	▲35.0%	▲22.1%	▼23.5%
Chief Minister before election
Reuben Meade
NPP
Subsequent Chief Minister
Bertrand Osborne
MNR

General elections were held in Montserrat on 11 November 1996. The result was a hung parliament, with no party holding more than two seats. Although the People's Progressive Alliance received the largest number of votes, Bertrand Osborne of the Movement for National Reconstruction became Chief Minister after forming a coalition government with the National Progressive Party (which had been the ruling party between 1991 and 1996) and an independent MP.

== Campaign ==
A total of 26 candidates contested the elections. All three parties nominated seven candidates, with five independents also running.

== Results ==
Party	Votes	%	Seats	+/–
People's Progressive Alliance	1,472	35.38	2	New
Movement for National Reconstruction	930	22.35	2	New
National Progressive Party	809	19.44	1	–3
Independents	950	22.83	2	+1
Total	4,161	100.00	7	0
Valid votes	4,161	98.93		
Invalid/blank votes	45	1.07		
Total votes	4,206	100.00		
Registered voters/turnout	7,238	58.11		
Source: Caribbean Elections, Barrow-Giles & Joseph

=== By constituency ===
Central Constituency
Party	Candidate	Votes	%	±%
National Progressive Party	Reuben Meade	292	46.4	−
	Charlesworth Phillip	202	32.0	−
	John Wilson	61	9.7	−
	Johnny Dublin	61	9.7	−
	Richard Payne	8	1.3	−

Eastern Constituency
Party	Candidate	Votes	%	±%
Movement for National Reconstruction	Adelina Tuitt	189	54.9	−
	Joel Webbe	119	34.6	−
	James Lee	24	6.9	−
	Nowell Tuitt	11	3.2	−

Northern Constituency
Party	Candidate	Votes	%	±%
Independent	Rupert Weekes	252	57.8	−
	John Ponteen	182	41.7	−
	Theo Bramble	2	0.5	−

Northwestern Constituency
Party	Candidate	Votes	%	±%
People's Progressive Alliance	John Osborne	379	53.9	−
	Charles Kirnon	222	31.6	−
	Jim Bass	89	12.7	−
	George Tuitt	13	1.8	−

Plymouth Constituency
Party	Candidate	Votes	%	±%
People's Progressive Alliance	Brunelle Meade	372	34.4	−
Movement for National Reconstruction	P. Austin Bramble	354	32.7	−
	Vereen Thomas Woolcock	126	11.7	−
	Lazelle Howes	116	10.7	−
	Chedmond Browne	93	8.6	−

Southern Constituency
Party	Candidate	Votes	%	±%
Movement for National Reconstruction	Bertrand Osborne	237	50.9	−
	Idabelle Griffith-Meade	193	41.4	−
	Justin Casell	36	7.7	−

Windward Constituency
Party	Candidate	Votes	%	±%
Independent	David Brandt	391	74.1	−
	Beatrice Fenton	107	20.3	−
	Joseph Meade	25	4.8	−
	J.R. Osborne	4	0.8	−
