= Percival Austin Bramble =

Montserrat politician (born 1931)

Percival Austin Bramble (born January 24, 1931) is a politician from Montserrat. He served as the territory's Chief Minister from December 1970 to November 1978. Bramble is the son of William Henry Bramble, the island's first chief minister. His premiership introduced free medical care for the elderly and established the foundation of the island's modern social security system. In 1975 he persuaded the British to agree to a local speaker to preside over the Legislative Council.

== Early life ==
Percival Austin Bramble was born in Cork Hill, Montserrat, on 24 January 1931. He was the son of William Henry Bramble who served as the first Chief Minister of Montserrat from 1960. Bramble worked initially as a teacher and was for a time in Curacao where he was a member of a trade union.

Bramble joined his father's Montserrat Labour Party (MLP) and won the Plymouth seat in the 1966 general election with 70% of the vote. His first campaign speech included the line, "I shall slander no one, I shall abuse no one; I shall make no enemies".

He served as Minister of Communications and Works from 1966 to 1969, when he joined the Ministry of Education, Health and Welfare. Bramble was expelled from the MLP shortly before the 1970 general election after a disagreement with his father over the allocation of real estate on the island. He contested the election for the new Progressive Democratic Party which he helped to found.

== Premiership ==
Bramble served as Chief Minister in the new government and retained both his seat and the government in the 1973 general election. On 4 July 1973 he signed the Treaty of Chaguaramas that founded the Caribbean Community intergovernmental organisation. He is the last surviving signatory of the treaty.

In government Bramble established factory units on the island and made loans to industry. He established a Philatelic Bureau to provide income and employment from the sale of stamps and negotiated the founding of the American University of the Caribbean on the island (although it was established under his successor).

Bramble introduced free milk for schoolchildren and free medical care for the elderly and those suffering from chronic illness. He also established nurseries and pre-primary education facilities. In 1972 he established the National Provident Fund that evolved into the modern Social Security Scheme to provide for pensioners and the unemployed. In 1975 he persuaded the British authorities to permit a local Speaker to preside over the Legislative Council in lieu of the appointed governor.

Low salaries became a political issue in the mid 1970s and a former minister in his administration, John Osborne, joined marches on the issue. Bramble lost the 1978 general election to Osborne's People's Liberation Movement; Osborne became chief minister.

== Later life ==
Bramble had lost his seat in the 1978 election but regained it in 1983, though his party remained in opposition. In retirement Bramble lives in London.

Preceded by William Henry Bramble	Chief Minister of Montserrat; 1970–1978	Succeeded by John Osborne
