= James Gordon MacGregor =

Canadian physicist

James Gordon MacGregor, FRS FRSE LLD (31 March 1852 in Halifax, Colony of Nova Scotia, British North America – 21 May 1913 in Edinburgh) was a Canadian physicist. He was described as "brilliant, energetic, nervous, impatient", and not suffering fools gladly.

== Life ==
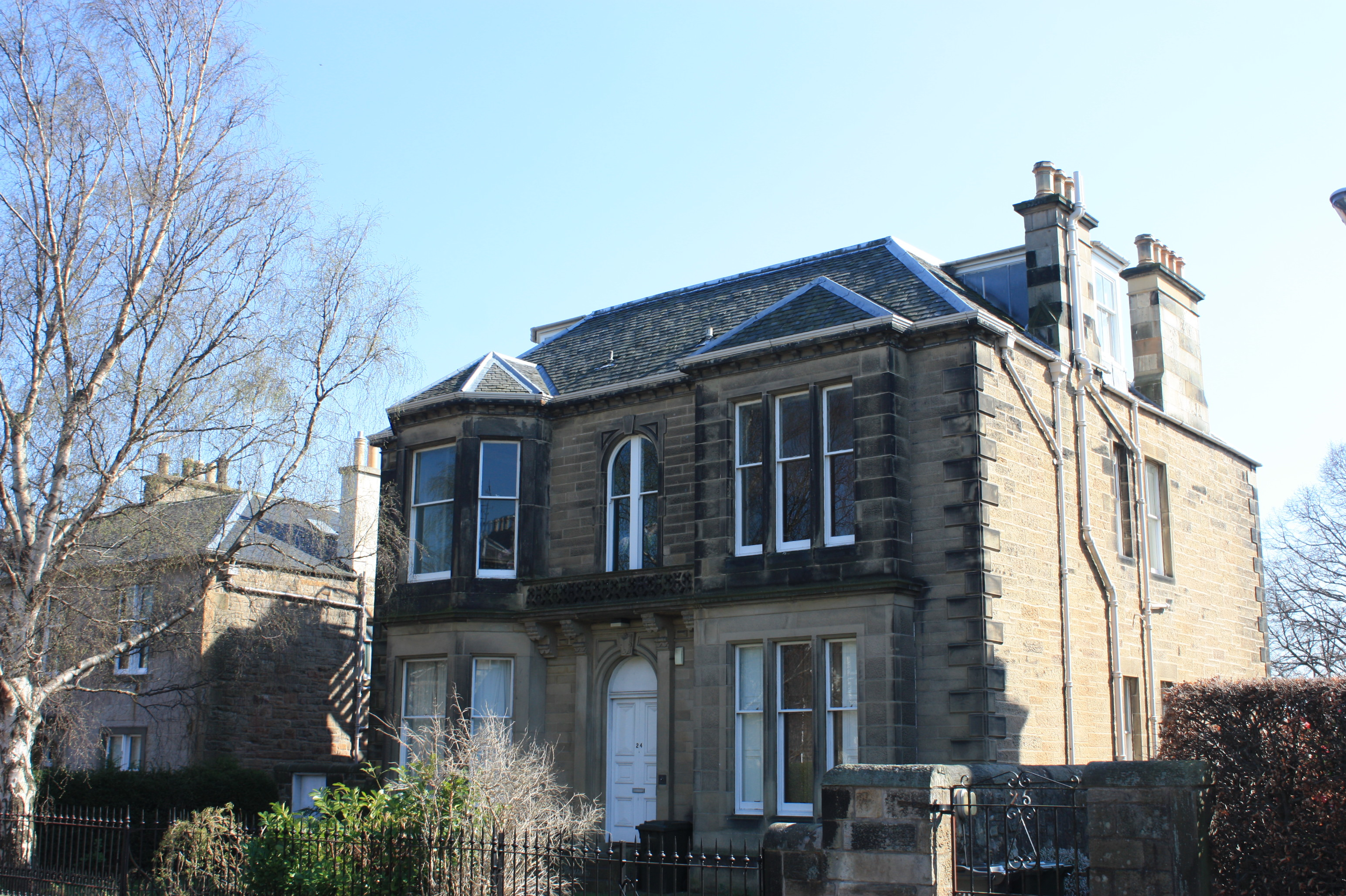
MacGregor's house at 24 Dalrymple Crescent, Edinburgh

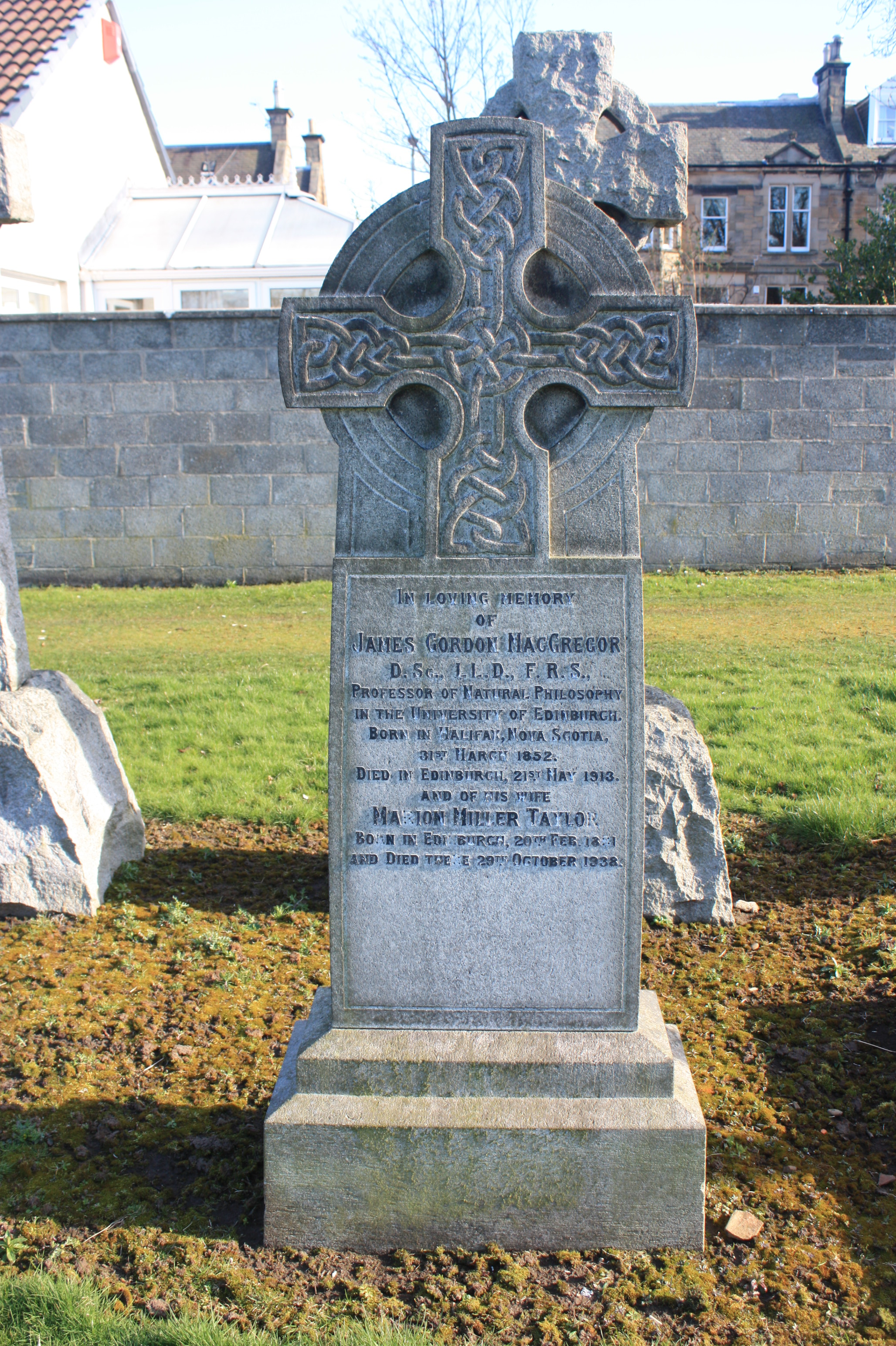
The grave of James Gordon MacGregor, Morningside Cemetery, Edinburgh

MacGregor was born in Halifax in Nova Scotia on 31 March 1852, the son of Rev Peter Gordon MacGregor. He was educated there at the Free Church Academy in Halifax going on to study at Dalhousie University, where he graduated with an MA. He left Nova Scotia to pursue postgraduate studies at the University of Edinburgh, the University of Leipzig and the University of London.

He returned to Nova Scotia to lecture in physics for one academic year (1876/1877) at his alma mater, Dalhousie University. In the summer of 1877 he relocated to England to serve as science master at Clifton College in Bristol. In 1879 he returned once again to Dalhousie University as a professor of physics, a role he remained in for 21 years.

While in Canada he retained links to Britain, because in 1880 he was elected an ordinary fellow (rather than a foreign or honorary fellow) of the Royal Society of Edinburgh. His proposers were Peter Guthrie Tait, Alexander Crum Brown, John Hutton Balfour and Edmund Albert Letts. In 1900 he was also elected a fellow of the Royal Society of London.

In 1901 he returned to Britain when he succeeded to Peter Guthrie Tait's chair of natural philosophy at the University of Edinburgh. The invitation was impossible to resist: "salary better, equipment good, pension laid on".

He died at his home, 24 Dalrymple Crescent in Edinburgh on 21 May 1913. He is buried in Morningside Cemetery in south Edinburgh. The grave lies in one of the southern rows.

== Publications ==
- An Elementary Treatise on Kinematics and Dynamics (1887)

== Family ==
In 1888 he married Marion Miller Taylor. When she died in 1938 she was buried with him. Their son, Archibald Gordon MacGregor (1894-1986) was also a noted geologist.
