= 2001 Montserratian general election =

General elections were held in Montserrat on 2 April 2001. The result was a victory for the New People's Liberation Movement (NLPM), which won seven of the nine seats in the Legislative Council. NLPM leader John Osborne became Chief Minister.

== Background ==
On 2 February 2001 Health Minister Adelina Tuitt and Communications Minister Rupert Weekes resigned from the cabinet of Chief Minister David Brandt. This led to the collapse of the government, which only had a one-seat majority, and forced early general elections.

== Electoral system ==
A new electoral system was introduced for the 2001 elections as a result of the volcanic eruptions rendering four of the seven constituencies uninhabitable. The seven single-member constituencies were replaced with one nine-member constituency in which voters could vote for nine candidates.

== Campaign ==
A total of 24 candidates contested the elections. The NLPM and the National Progressive Party both fielded nine candidates, with six independents also running.

== Results ==
Party	Votes	%	Seats	+/–
New People's Liberation Movement	9,859	51.84	7	+3
National Progressive Party	6,765	35.57	2	+1
Independents	2,394	12.59	0	–2
Total	19,018	100.00	9	+2
Valid votes	2,242	97.99		
Invalid/blank votes	46	2.01		
Total votes	2,288	100.00		
Registered voters/turnout	2,953	77.48		
Source: Caribbean Elections
