= 1937 Montserratian general election =

General elections were held in Montserrat in 1937. They were the first elections since the 1860s.

== Background ==
The partially elected Legislative Assembly dissolved itself in 1866 and was replaced with a wholly appointed body. This remained in place until 1937 when constitutional reforms reintroduced elected members. The reorganised legislature had nine seats; four elected, three held by government officials and two by nominees appointed by the Governor.

== Results ==
The six members elected or appointed were:

- John Clifford Llewelyn Wall
- H F Shand
- James H Meade
- Alfred H Allen
- Randoph Howes
- A W Griffin
