= 1961 Montserratian general election =

General elections were held in Montserrat on 2 March 1961. The result was a victory for the Montserrat Labour Party, which won five of the seven seats in the Legislative Council. MLP leader William Henry Bramble remained Chief Minister.

== Background ==
The elections followed the introduction of a new constitution in 1960, which provided for a ministerial system of government. The number of elected seats in the Legislative Council was increased from five to seven.

== Results ==
| Party | Votes | % | Seats | +/– |
|---|---|---|---|---|
| Montserrat Labour Party | 1,512 | 57.67 | 5 | +2 |
| Montserrat United Workers' Movement | 1,110 | 42.33 | 2 | New |
| Total | 2,622 | 100.00 | 7 | +2 |
| Valid votes | 2,622 | 98.65 | | |
| Invalid/blank votes | 36 | 1.35 | | |
| Total votes | 2,658 | 100.00 | | |
| Registered voters/turnout | 4,639 | 57.30 | | |
Source: Emmanuel

=== Elected MPs ===
| Constituency | Elected MP | Party |
|---|---|---|
| Central | Michael Edward Walkinshaw | Montserrat Labour Party |
| Eastern | William Henry Bramble | Montserrat Labour Party |
| North-Western | David Fenton | Montserrat Labour Party |
| Northern | James Allen | Montserrat United Workers' Movement |
| Plymouth | Margaret Rose Kelsick | Montserrat Labour Party |
| Southern | Michael Dyer | Montserrat United Workers' Movement |
| Windward | Brunel Wycliffe Edwards | Montserrat Labour Party |
