= 1978 Montserratian general election =

General elections were held in Montserrat in 23 November 1978. The result was a victory for the People's Liberation Movement (PLM), which won all seven seats in the Legislative Council. PLM leader John Osborne became Chief Minister.

== Campaign ==
A total of 18 candidates contested the elections; both the PLM and the ruling Progressive Democratic Party nominated seven candidates, with four independents also running.

== Results ==
Party	Votes	%	Seats	+/–
People's Liberation Movement	2,695	62.10	7	New
Progressive Democratic Party	1,442	33.23	0	–6
Independents	203	4.68	0	–1
Total	4,340	100.00	7	0
Valid votes	4,340	97.75		
Invalid/blank votes	100	2.25		
Total votes	4,440	100.00		
Registered voters/turnout	5,679	78.18		
Source: Emmanuel

=== Elected MPs ===
Constituency	Elected MP	Party
Central	J S Dublin	People's Liberation Movement
Eastern	N Tuitt	People's Liberation Movement
North-Western	John Osborne	People's Liberation Movement
Northern	J B Chalmers	People's Liberation Movement
Plymouth	F Margetson	People's Liberation Movement
Southern	J A Taylor	People's Liberation Movement
Windward	T E Meade	People's Liberation Movement
