= Pan Am Flight 292 =

1965 aviation accident in Montserrat

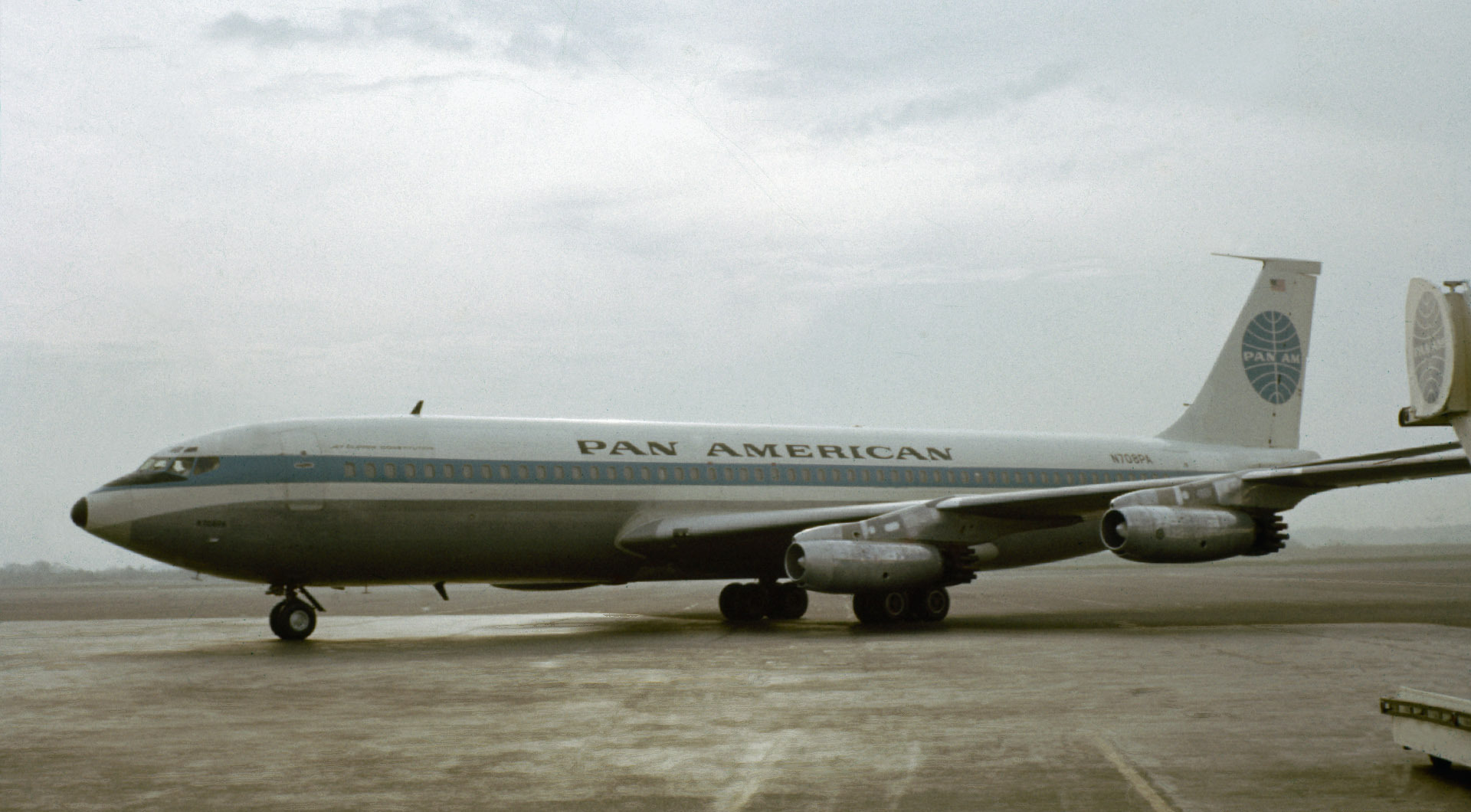
- N708PA, the aircraft involved in the accident, pictured in 1961

Accident
- Date: 17 September 1965
- Summary: Pilot error, controlled flight into terrain
- Site: Chances Peak, Montserrat; 16°42′18″N 62°10′58″W(approximate location)

Aircraft
- Aircraft type: Boeing 707-121B
- Aircraft name: Clipper Constitution
- Operator: Pan American World Airways
- Call sign: CLIPPER 292
- Registration: N708PA
- Flight origin: Fort-de-France - Le Lamentin Airport, Martinique
- 1st stopover: Coolidge International Airport, St. John's, Antigua
- Last stopover: San Juan, Puerto Rico
- Destination: New York City
- Occupants: 30
- Passengers: 21
- Crew: 9
- Fatalities: 30
- Survivors: 0

Pan Am Flight 292 was operated by a Boeing 707 that flew into Chances Peak on the island of Montserrat on 17 September 1965 while on a flight from Fort-de-France - Le Lamentin Airport in Martinique to Coolidge International Airport in Antigua and Barbuda. The aircraft was destroyed, and there were no survivors among the 30 passengers and crew on board.

== Aircraft ==
The aircraft, bearing the registration N708PA and named Clipper Constitution by its owner Pan American World Airways (Pan Am), was the first Boeing 707 ever built, and made the first flight of the type on 20 December 1957. It had been used by Boeing on test flights prior to delivery to Pan Am in November the following year.

== Crash ==
The aircraft departed Fort-de-France's Le Lamentin Airport on a scheduled flight to New York City via St. John's, Antigua and Barbuda and San Juan, Puerto Rico. There were 21 passengers and a crew of nine on board. While on approach to Coolidge International Airport in stormy weather, at an altitude of 2,760 ft (841 m), the aircraft hit the 3,002 ft (915 m)-high Chances Peak in Montserrat and caught fire.

== Cause ==
The cause was determined to be pilot error: the crew made a navigational error and descended below the safe minimum altitude while unsure of their position.
