= Amersham, Montserrat =

Amersham
- Abandoned village
- Location of Amersham within Montserrat Amersham (the Caribbean)
- Coordinates: 16°42′N 62°12′W
- Country: United Kingdom
- Overseas Territory: Montserrat
- Region: Saint Anthony
- Zone: Exclusion Zone
- Elevation: 191 m (627 ft)
- Time zone: UTC-6 (ECT)

Amersham is an abandoned village in the Saint Anthony Parish on the island of Montserrat. The village, located north of the former neighbouring village of Kinsale, had a small population before the Soufrière Hills volcano erupted in 1995.

== Amersham Estate ==
The village used to have an estate called Amersham Estate.
