= W. H. Bramble Airport =

Former international airport on the island of Montserrat

W. H. Bramble (Blackburne) Airport
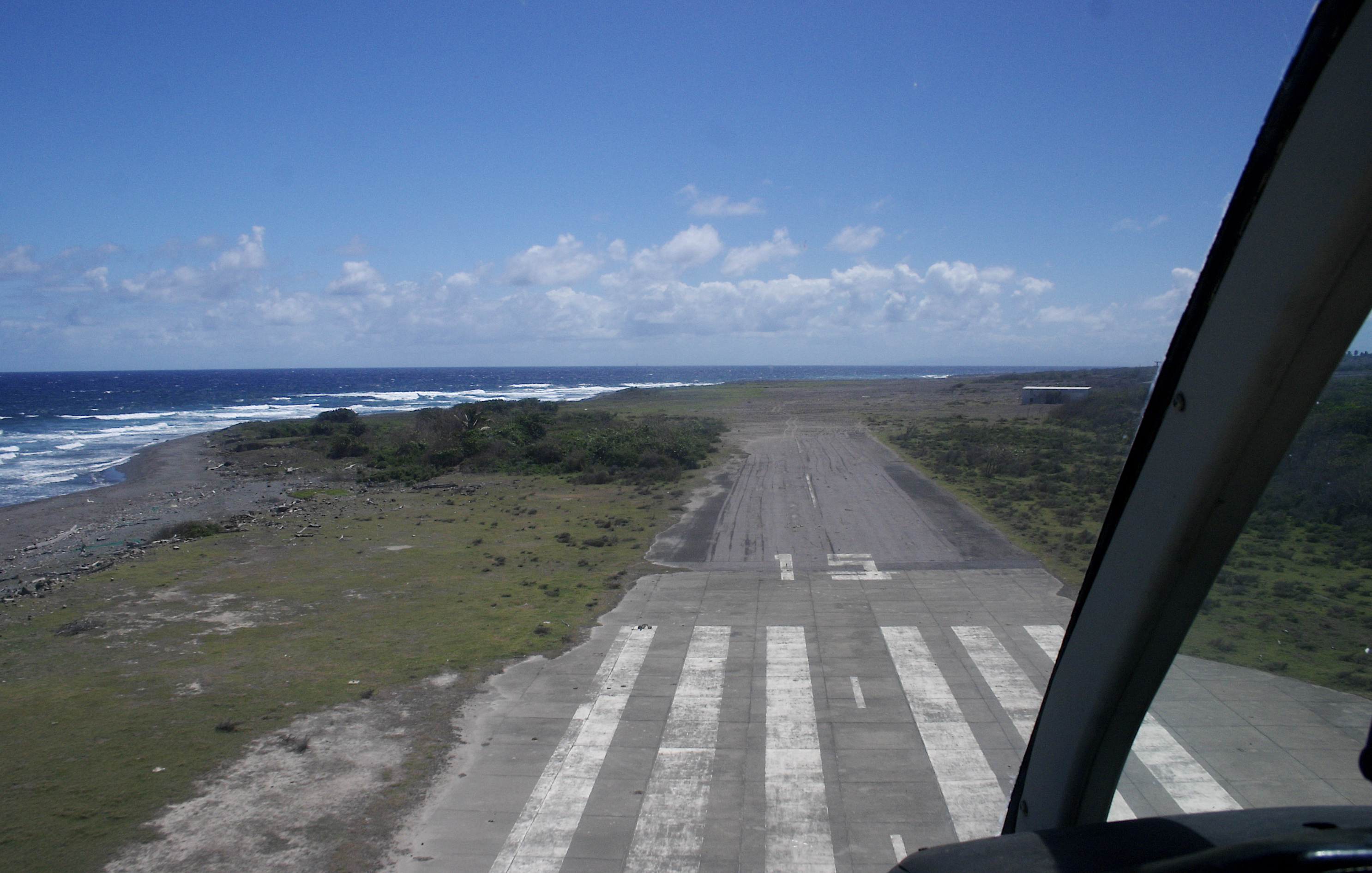
- The remains of the airport (photographed in 2006)
- IATA: ~~MNI~~; ICAO: ~~TRPM~~

Summary
- Airport type: Public
- Operator: none
- Location: Trants, Montserrat
- Coordinates: 16°45′32″N 62°9′23″W

Map
- Location in Montserrat

Runways
Direction	Length		Surface
Direction	m	ft	Surface
~~15/33~~	~~1,030~~	~~3,380~~	~~Asphalt~~

W. H. Bramble Airport, formerly known as Blackburne Airport, was an international airport on the east coast of the island of Montserrat, a British Overseas Territory in the Caribbean. It was named after Chief Minister of Montserrat William Henry Bramble and destroyed by volcanic activity in 1997.

== History ==
Blackburne Airport was founded in 1956 under the leadership of William Henry Bramble. Named for colonial governor Sir Kenneth Blackburne, the airport initially boasted a 3,000-foot (910 m) compact earth runway, with stone foundations for 500 feet (150 m) feet in the touch-down area. The airport received a major extension in 1961 with Canadian funding. A 3,400-foot (1,040 m) surfaced runway was opened on 16 August 1967. During the 1960s, Leeward Islands Air Transport maintained twice-daily service between Montserrat and Antigua and five days a week service between Montserrat and Saint Kitts and Nevis.

Planned airport expansion in early 1995 was complicated by the fact that the nearby settlement of Trants was the site of archaeological excavation, and the UK Overseas Development Administration funded a 17-week mitigation project in order to evaluate sites located within the airport development area.

After a more than decade-long campaign, the Blackburne Airport was set to be renamed after W. H. Bramble in August 1995.

=== Destruction ===
During the eruption of the Soufrière Hills volcano, the airport was evacuated and completely ceased to operate following serious pyroclastic flow activity on 25 June 1997. The airport terminal buildings were observed to be destroyed on 21 September 1997. Until its evacuation, the airport was the site of volcanic observations by time-lapse video camera which were later used to help estimate mean velocities of the flow pulse fronts resulting from the volcano's partial dome collapse. In February 2010, renewed pyroclastic flow activity blanketed the entire area under meters of ash and rock.

After the volcanic eruption, Montserrat was only accessible by helicopter or boat until John A. Osborne Airport (formerly Gerald's Airport) was completed in 2005.

In 2024, Premier of Montserrat Joseph E. Farrell unfavorably compared John A. Osborne Airport to the former W. H. Bramble Airport, citing the fact that Bramble Airport could accommodate 14-seater aircraft while Osborne Airport, being smaller, could only accommodate nine-seater aircraft.
