= Mary Rose Tuitt =

Montserrat politician

- Born: Mary Rose Peters; 25 December 1930; Kinsale
- Died: 2005 (aged 74–75)
- Education: Erdiston Teachers' Training College
- Occupation: Politician
- Spouse: Adolphus Tuitt
- Parents: Edgar Peters (father); Sarah Ryan (mother)

Mary Rose Tuitt (25 December 1930 – 2005) was an educator and politician from the island of Montserrat, a British Overseas Territory in the Caribbean. She was the first woman to serve as a government minister in that country.

== Life and work ==
Tuitt was the daughter of Edgar Peters and Sarah Ryan (née Dorsett). She was born Mary Rose Peters in Kinsale, Montserrat. She studied at the Erdiston Teachers' Training College in Barbados from 1953 to 1955.

When she returned to Montserrat after her studies, she was named head teacher at St. Patrick's school. She studied for an additional year at the University of Oxford Institute of Education. In 1958, she married Adolphus Tuitt.

She resigned in 1968 after being passed over for the position of inspector of schools. Tuitt was transferred to the Ministry of Social Services, but resigned that position. For a short time, she managed the historic Coconut Hill Hotel on the island.

In 1970, Tuitt ran as a candidate for the Progressive Democratic Party in the Southern district and was elected to the Legislative Council of Montserrat, only the second woman to do so. In that same year, she was named Minister of Education and Health and Welfare, thus becoming the "first lady Minister of Government."

A number of significant developments came during Mrs. Tuitt's tenure as Minister. Junior secondary education and a technical college were established to create more and better opportunities for students at the post-primary level. The expansion also occurred at the bottom end with the introduction of pre-schools. She may not have been the prime mover in every case, but the developments had her support. And the Kingdom of Jersey's gift of a school at Long Ground was certainly her initiative.

In 1978, she again for office but lost to Joseph Tailor in a close bid for reelection.

After leaving politics, she worked in an administrative position at the American University of the Caribbean, an offshore medical school.

Tuitt was also an accomplished netball player who began playing while in secondary school and joined the national team in 1950. She was captain of the Montserrat team in 1959, and in 1963, she was its coach and manager. She also served as president of the Montserrat Netball Association and the West Indies Netball Board.
