= Montserrat Labour Party =

The Montserrat Labour Party (MLP) was a political party in Montserrat.

== History ==
The party was established in 1951, and was linked with the Montserrat Trades and Labour Union. In the 1952 elections, the first held under universal suffrage, the party won all five seats in the Legislative Council. It lost two seats in the 1955 elections, but won four seats in 1958.

Constitutional changes in 1960 created the post of Chief Minister, with MLP leader William Henry Bramble becoming the first person to hold the post. The party won five of the seven seats in the 1961 and 1966 elections.

The 1970 elections were the first occasion on which the MLP had faced serious opposition. Percival Austin Bramble, son of William, had previously been a member of the MLP and was elected to the Legislative Council as an MLP candidate in the 1966 elections. However, he subsequently broke away to form the Progressive Democratic Party (PDP) as a result of controversy over the number of holiday and retirement homes being built on the island. The PDP won all seven seats in the elections, leaving the MLP without parliamentary representation.

The party remained dormant until being resurrected to contest the 2009 elections. Re-established by Idabelle Meade, Chedmond Browne and Margaret Dyer-Howe and led by Meade, it nominated three candidates. Despite finishing second in the popular vote, it failed to win a seat.
