= People's Liberation Movement (Montserrat) =

Political party in Montserrat

The People's Liberation Movement (PLM) was a political party in Montserrat.

== History ==
The PLM was established by John Osborne in 1973. In the 1978 elections it won all seven seats in the Legislative Council, with Osborne becoming Chief Minister.

The party also won the 1983 elections, claiming five of the seven seats. In the 1987 elections it was reduced to four seats, but maintained a majority in the Legislative Council. However, Minister of Communications Benjamin Chalmers left the party over corruption allegations, meaning it lost its majority. As a result, early elections were held in 1991, in which the party lost all four seats.

In 1996 the party was dissolved and replaced by the People's Progressive Alliance. In 2001 the PPA merged with the Movement for National Reconstruction to form the New People's Liberation Movement.
