= 1955 Montserratian general election =

General elections were held in Montserrat on 18 March 1955. The result was a victory for the Montserrat Labour Party, which won three of the five seats in the Legislative Council. The other two seats were taken by the independent candidate Robert William Griffith (who had left the MLP) and a Merchant Planter, William Lleweyn Wall.

== Results ==
Party	Votes	%	Seats	+/–
Montserrat Labour Party	1,246	44.12	3	–2
Merchant Planters	1,066	37.75	1	+1
Independents	512	18.13	1	New
Total	2,824	100.00	5	0
Valid votes	2,824	98.78		
Invalid/blank votes	35	1.22		
Total votes	2,859	100.00		
Registered voters/turnout	2,911	98.21		
Source: Caribbean Elections

=== Elected MPs ===
Constituency	Elected MP	Party
Central	Michael Walkinshaw	Montserrat Labour Party
Northern	Edward Theophilus Edgecombe	Montserrat Labour Party
Southern	Robert William Griffith	Independent
Southern	James Clifford Llewellyn Wall	Merchant Planters
Windward	William Henry Bramble	Montserrat Labour Party
