= Archibald Gordon MacGregor =

Scottish geologist

- Citizenship: British
- Education: Edinburgh Academy & University of Edinburgh
- Occupation: Geologist
- Organization: HM Geological Survey

Archibald Gordon MacGregor MC FRSE FGS (1894-19 December 1986) was a 20th-century geologist of Scots descent. He was Assistant Director of the British Geological Survey. Friends knew him as Archie MacGregor.

== Early life and education ==
He was born in Halifax, Nova Scotia the son of James Gordon MacGregor, a geologist who spent time in both Scotland and Nova Scotia. The family returned to Edinburgh in 1901, living at 6 Chalmers Crescent in The Grange.

Archibald attended Edinburgh Academy 1904 to 1912. He then studied science at the University of Edinburgh specialising in geology.

== Career ==
His life, as many others, was disrupted by World War I during which he was commissioned as a 2nd Lieutenant in the Royal Engineers (Signals Division), seeing service in France and Germany and being demobbed in 1919. He won the Military Cross during the Battle of the Lys in April 1918. He graduated with a BSc in science in 1921.

In 1921 he began working as a geologist for HM Geological Survey. He stayed there for his entire career, becoming District Geologist in 1945, covering the Scottish Highlands. He became Assistant Director in 1952.

In 1932 he was elected a Fellow of the Royal Society of Edinburgh. His proposers were Sir John Smith Flett, Thomas James Jehu, Murray Macgregor, James Ernest Richey, Charles Glover Barkla. In 1936 he accompanied Dr C F Powell on a Royal Society expedition to Montserrat, to investigate the origins of a damaging sequence of earthquakes that had struck the island. In 1938, MacGregor was awarded a D.Sc degree from the University of Edinburgh.

He won the Geological Society of London's Murchison Fund in 1940 and the Murchison Medal in 1960, a year after his retirement. He won Edinburgh Geological Society's Clough Medal in 1968.

He died at home, 45 Thorburn Road in Colinton, Edinburgh on 19 December 1986.

== Publications ==
- Signals from the Great War
- Problems of Carboniferous-Permian Volcanicity in Scotland (1948)
