= 1987 Montserratian general election =

General elections were held in Montserrat on 25 August 1987. The result was a victory for the People's Liberation Movement (PLM), which won four of the seven seats in the Legislative Council. PLM leader John Osborne remained Chief Minister.

== Results ==
| Party | Votes | % | Seats | +/– |
|---|---|---|---|---|
| People's Liberation Movement | 2,298 | 44.87 | 4 | –1 |
| National Development Party | 1,714 | 33.46 | 2 | New |
| Progressive Democratic Party | 1,110 | 21.67 | 1 | –1 |
| Total | 5,122 | 100.00 | 7 | 0 |
| Valid votes | 5,122 | 96.41 | | |
| Invalid/blank votes | 191 | 3.59 | | |
| Total votes | 5,313 | 100.00 | | |
| Registered voters/turnout | 7,461 | 71.21 | | |
Source: Emmanuel
