= 1952 Montserratian general election =

General elections were held in Montserrat on 20 February 1952. They were the first elections in Montserrat held under universal suffrage, which had been introduced the previous year. The result was a victory for the Montserrat Labour Party, which won all five seats in the Legislative Council.

== Campaign ==
A total of 11 candidates contested the elections, with the MLP running a full slate of candidates and the Merchant Planters putting forward four. As a result, Michael Walkinshaw was elected unopposed in the Central constituency.

== Results ==
Party	Votes	%	Seats
Montserrat Labour Party	2,033	69.48	5
Merchant Planters	893	30.52	0
Total	2,926	100.00	5
Valid votes	2,926	97.08	
Invalid/blank votes	88	2.92	
Total votes	3,014	100.00	
Registered voters/turnout	3,019	99.83	
Source: Emmanuel

=== Elected MPs ===
Constituency	Elected MP	Party
Central	Michael Walkinshaw	Montserrat Labour Party
Northern	Edward Theophilus Edgecombe	Montserrat Labour Party
Plymouth	Robert William Griffith	Montserrat Labour Party
Southern	Brunel Wycliffe Edwards	Montserrat Labour Party
Windward	William Henry Bramble	Montserrat Labour Party
