= 1966 Montserratian general election =

General elections were held in Montserrat in 1966. The result was a victory for the Montserrat Labour Party, which won five of the seven seats in the Legislative Council. MLP leader William Henry Bramble remained Chief Minister.

== Campaign ==
A total of 20 candidates contested the elections; the MLP had a full slate of seven candidates, the Montserrat Workers' Progressive Party nominated five, with the remaining eight running as independents.

== Results ==
Party	Votes	%	Seats	+/–
Montserrat Labour Party	2,395	60.83	5	0
Montserrat Workers' Progressive Party	611	15.52	1	New
Independents	931	23.65	1	New
Total	3,937	100.00	7	0
Valid votes	3,937	98.28		
Invalid/blank votes	69	1.72		
Total votes	4,006	100.00		
Registered voters/turnout	7,265	55.14		
Source: Emmanuel

=== Elected MPs ===
Constituency	Elected MP	Party
Central	Eustace Dyer	Montserrat Labour Party
Eastern	Brunel Wycliffe Edwards	Montserrat Labour Party
North-Western	John Osborne	Montserrat Progressive Workers' Party
Northern	James Joseph Howe	Montserrat Labour Party
Plymouth	Percival Austin Bramble	Montserrat Labour Party
Southern	Michael Dyer	Independent
Windward	William Henry Bramble	Montserrat Labour Party
