= 1958 Montserratian general election =

General elections were held in Montserrat on 8 May 1958. The result was a victory for the Montserrat Labour Party, which won four of the five seats in the Legislative Council.

== Campaign ==
A total of eleven candidates contested the elections, with the MLP nominating five, the Montserrat Democratic Party two and the remaining four running as independents.

== Results ==
Party	Votes	%	Seats	+/–
Montserrat Labour Party	1,833	55.73	4	0
Montserrat Democratic Party	402	12.22	0	New
Independents	1,054	32.05	1	0
Total	3,289	100.00	5	0
Source: Fergus
