= David Brandt (politician) =

Montserratian politician

6th Chief Minister of Montserrat
- In office 22 August 1997 – 5 April 2001
- Monarch: Elizabeth II
- Governor: Tony Abbott
- Preceded by: Bertrand Osborne
- Succeeded by: John Osborne

Personal details
- Born: David Brandt
- Spouse: Verna Brandt
- Education: University of the West Indies (LL.B); Sir Hugh Wooding Law School (LEC); University of London (LL.M)
- Occupation: Attorney-at-Law

David Samuel Brandt is an attorney and politician from Montserrat who served as the island's 6th Chief Minister from 22 August 1997 to 5 April 2001. In July 2021 he was sentenced to fifteen years imprisonment after being convicted of sexual exploitation and perverting the course of justice.

== Sex crimes ==
In September 2015, Brandt was charged with two counts of conspiracy to have sexual intercourse with a minor. He was released on EC$20,000 bail. In November 2018, Brandt was arrested again and subsequently charged with two counts of child sexual exploitation and one count of perverting the course of justice. He was released on bail in the amount of EC$90,000. The Government of the United Kingdom through the National Crime Agency has spent more than £200,000 to investigate Brandt's alleged child sex abuse. He was finally tried in 2021 on six sexual exploitation charges and one count of perverting the course of justice; the jury found him guilty on six of the seven charges on 30 June. He was sentenced on 19 July to six concurrent jail terms, the longest being fifteen years for the count of perverting the course of justice.

Preceded by Bertrand Osborne	Chief Minister of Montserrat; 1997–2001	Succeeded by John Osborne
