= Bertrand Osborne =

Chief Minister of Montserrat (1996–1997)

Bertrand Osborne (18 April 1935 – 4 September 2018) was a British politician from Montserrat. He served as the territory's Chief Minister from 13 November 1996 to 22 August 1997. He resigned from his post amid demonstrations over his dealings with the British government in the wake of the island nation being ravaged by an eruption of the Soufrière Hills volcano.

Preceded by Reuben Meade	Chief Minister of Montserrat; 1996–1997	Succeeded by David Brandt
