= Soufrière Hills =

Volcano on Montserrat in the Caribbean

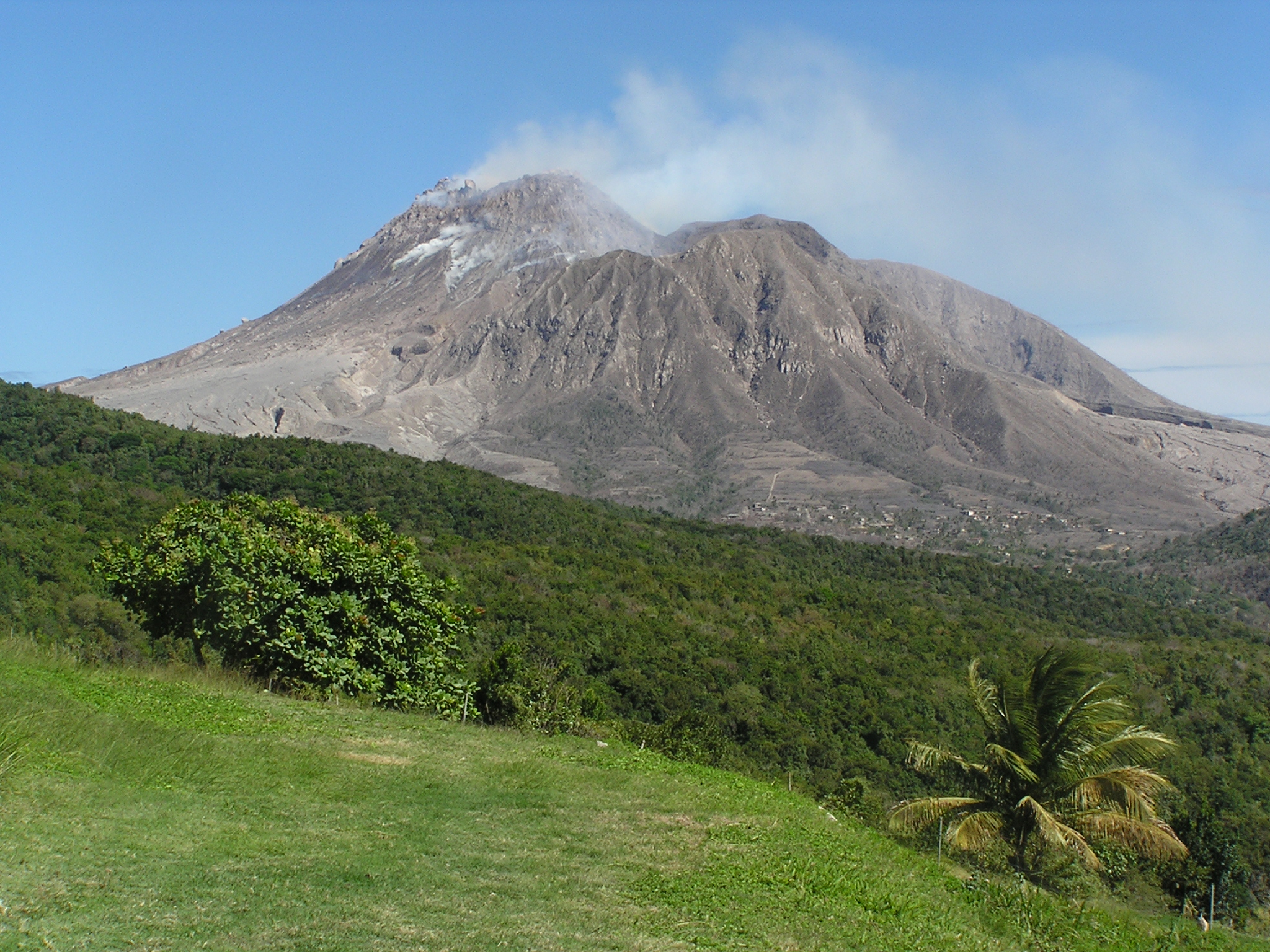
- Soufrière Hills (before July 2007)

Highest point
- Elevation: 1,050 m (3,440 ft)
- Prominence: 1,050 m (3,440 ft)
- Isolation: 64.99 km (40.38 mi)
- Listing: Ribu
- Coordinates: 16°43′N 62°11′W

Geography
- Location within Montserrat
- Location: Location in Montserrat
- Country: Montserrat

Geology
- Formed by: Subduction zone volcanism
- Mountain type: Stratovolcano
- Volcanic arc: Lesser Antilles Volcanic Arc
- Last eruption: 2013

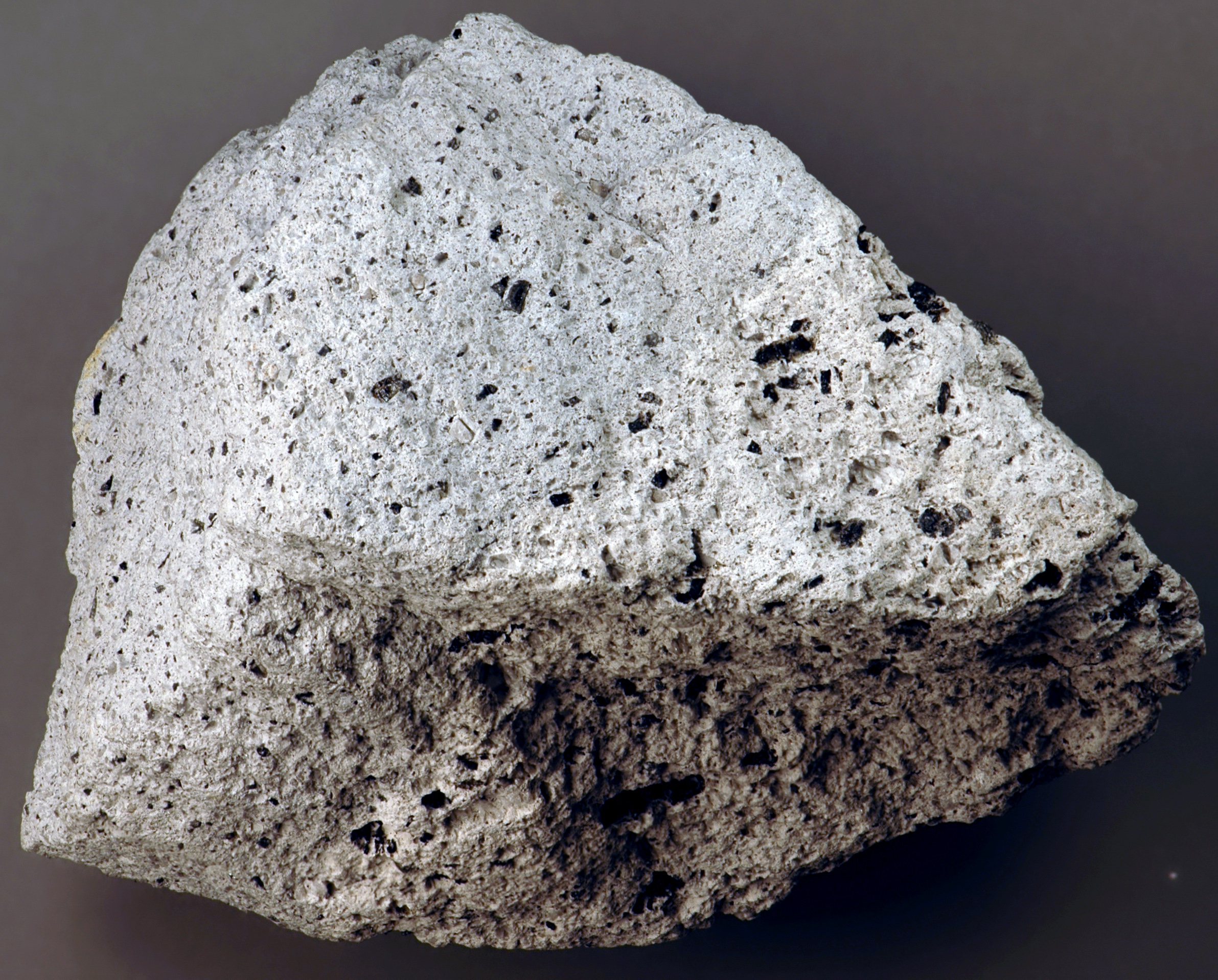
Andesite erupted by Soufrière Hills volcano in 1997

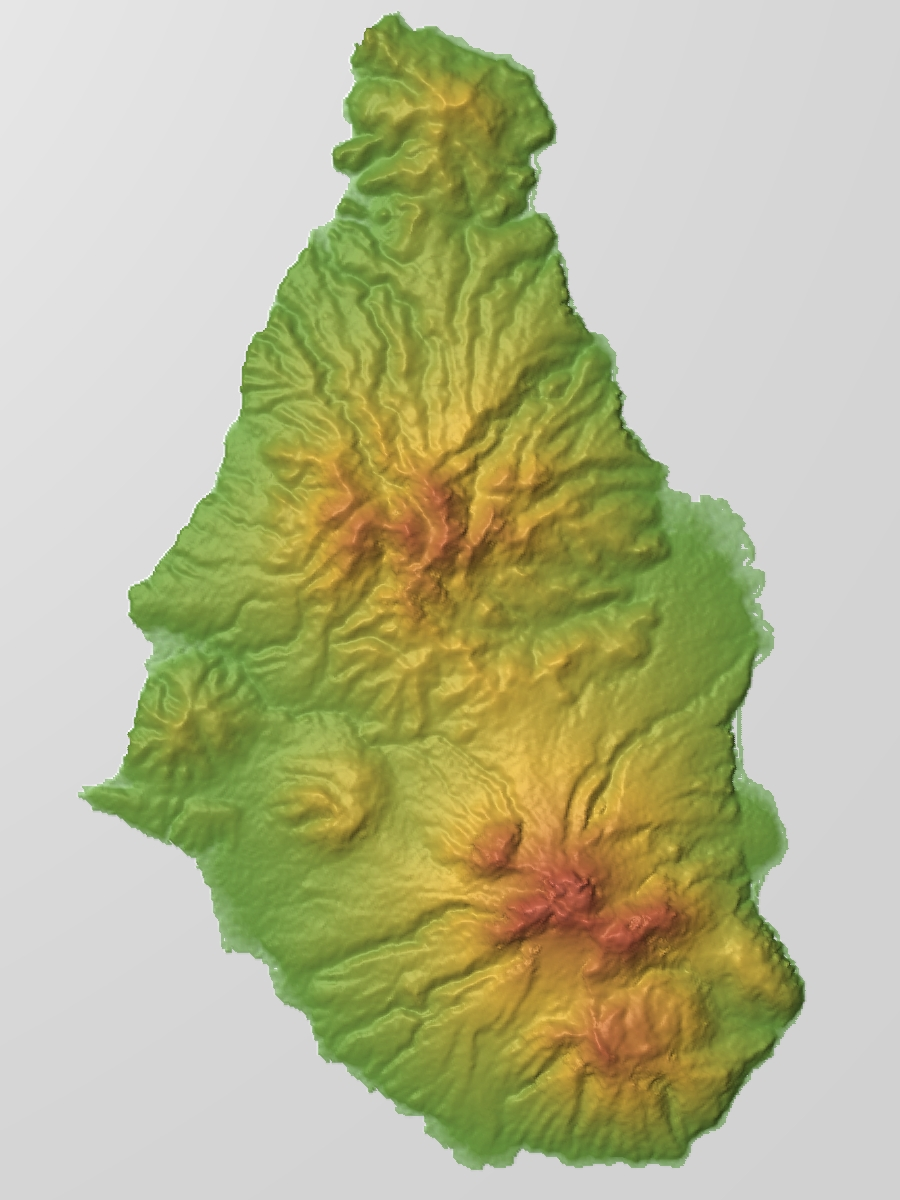
Relief Map

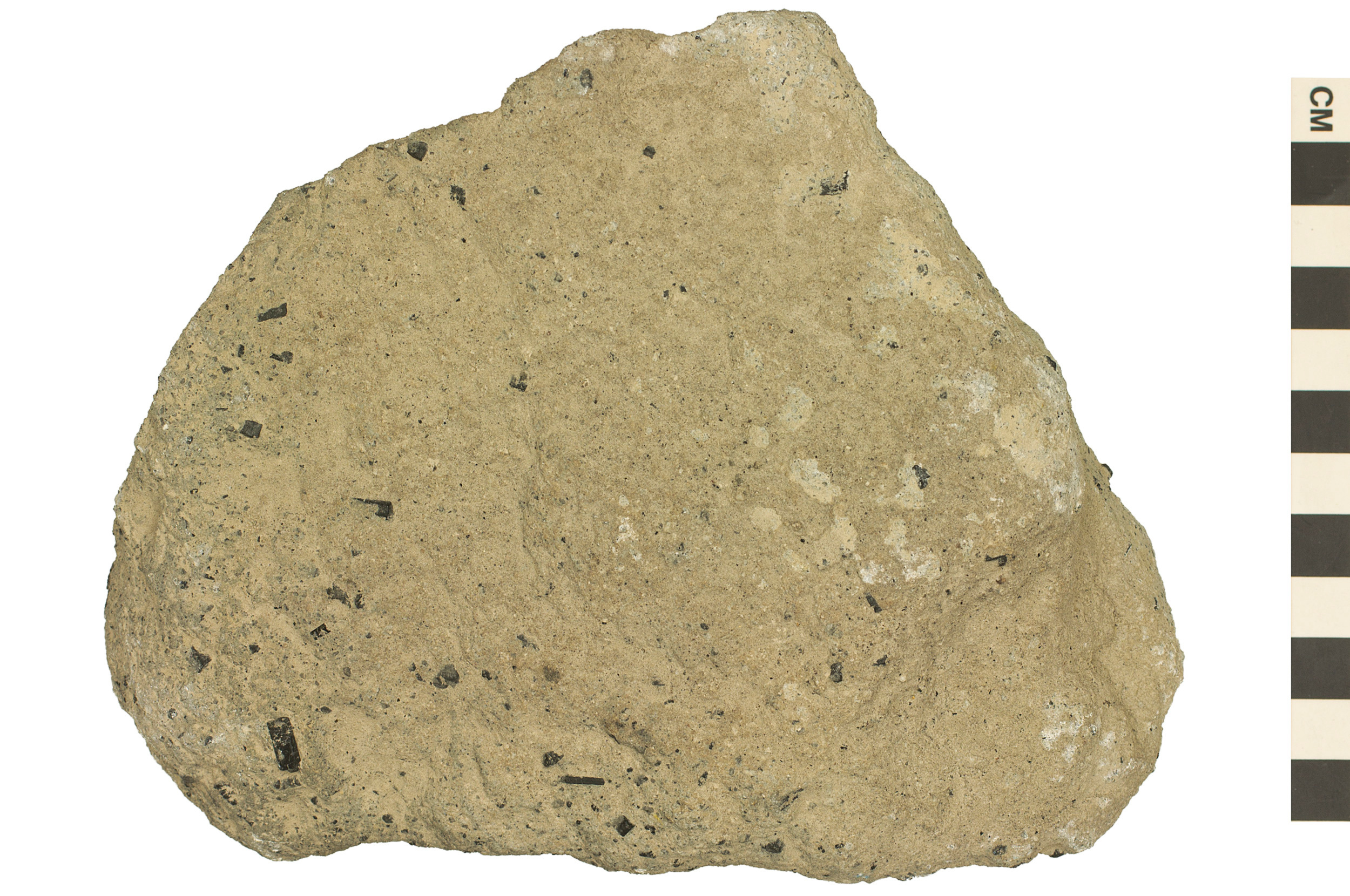
Volcanic ash (tuff) from Montserrat

The Soufrière Hills (/ˈsuːfriɛər/) is an active, complex stratovolcano with many lava domes forming its summit on the Caribbean island of Montserrat, an overseas territory of the United Kingdom. After a long period of dormancy, the Soufrière Hills volcano became active in 1995 and continued to erupt until 2010. Its last eruption was in 2013. Its eruptions have rendered more than half of Montserrat uninhabitable, destroying the capital city, Plymouth, and causing widespread evacuations: about two-thirds of the population have left the island. Chances Peak in the Soufrière Hills was the highest summit on Montserrat until the mid-1990s, but it has since been eclipsed by various rising and falling volcanic domes during the recent volcanic activity.

The volcano is andesitic in nature, and the current pattern of activity includes periods of lava dome growth, punctuated by brief episodes of dome collapse which result in pyroclastic flows, ash venting, and explosive eruption. The volcano is monitored by the Montserrat Volcano Observatory. Volcanic gas emissions from this volcano are measured by a multi-component gas analyzer system, which detects pre-eruptive degassing of rising magmas, improving prediction of volcanic activity.

The Centre Hills in the central part of the island and the Silver Hills in the north are older volcanic massifs related to the subduction zone. There are three main parts of the island: the central zone, subduction and exclusion.

== Name ==
Many volcanoes in the Caribbean are named Soufrière (French for 'sulphur outlet'). These include La Soufrière or Soufrière Saint Vincent on the island of Saint Vincent, and La Grande Soufrière on Guadeloupe.

== Early history ==
- 2460 BC (± 70 years): An explosive eruption formed the crater at the top of the volcano.
- 1550 AD (± 50 years): Between 25 and 65 million cubic metres of lava erupted at Castle Peak.

== 1995–1999 eruption ==
Map of Montserrat, showing the exclusion zone following the eruption

Seismic activity had occurred in 1897–1898, 1933–1937, and again in 1966–1967, but the eruption that began on 18 July 1995 was the first since the turn of the 20th century. The first phreatic explosion in this new period of activity occurred on 21 August 1995, and such activity lasted for 18 weeks until it caused an andesitic lava dome formation. This was initially confined by a sector-collapse scar, first identified in the 1930's and called English's Crater. This period of activity lasted for another 60 weeks, after which there were major dome collapses and two periods of explosive volcanic eruptions and fountain-collapse pyroclastic flows. The explosion blanketed Plymouth, 6 kilometres (3.7 mi) away, in a thick layer of ash and darkened the sky almost completely.

Pyroclastic flows were first observed on 27 March 1996. Although these pyroclastic flows and mudflows were initially confined to unpopulated areas, a major pyroclastic flow on 17 September 1996 caused severe damage to the village of Long Ground, near the volcano. By August 1997, much of the southern part of the island, including most of Plymouth, had been buried by pyroclastic flows.

During this period, the southern portion of the island, including the capital Plymouth, was evacuated three times. The first evacuation lasted from 21 August 1995 – 3 September 1995, after the first phreatic eruption. The second evacuation began on 1 December 1995, due to growth of the lava dome. Residents were allowed back to most areas, including Plymouth, on 1 January 1996, but residents of some areas on the eastern flank of the volcano were not allowed back until 15 January 1996. On 3 April 1996, after pyroclastic flows and mudflows began occurring regularly, southern Montserrat, including the capital, Plymouth, was permanently evacuated.

Earthquakes continued to occur in three epicentre zones: beneath the Soufrière Hills volcano, in the ridge running to the northeast, and beneath St George's Hill, about 5 kilometres (3.1 mi) to the northwest. A large eruption on 25 June 1997 resulted in the deaths of nineteen people. The island's airport was directly in the path of the main pyroclastic flow and was completely destroyed. Montserrat's tourist industry also collapsed, although it began partially to recover within fifteen years.

The governments of the United Kingdom and Montserrat led the aid effort, including a £41 million package provided to the Montserrat population; however, riots followed as the people protested that the British Government was not doing enough for aid relief. The riots followed a £10 million aid offer by International Development Secretary Clare Short, prompting the resignation of Bertrand Osborne, then Chief Minister of Montserrat, after allegations that he was too pro-British and had not demanded a better offer.

The British destroyer HMS Liverpool took a major role in evacuating Montserrat's population to other islands, including Antigua and Barbuda who warned they would not be able to cope with many more refugees. About 7,000 people, or two-thirds of the population, left Montserrat; 4,000 went to the United Kingdom.

=== Abandoned settlements ===
The following is a list of Montserrat settlements abandoned by the eruption of the Soufrière Hills volcano:

- Amersham
- Bethel†
- Bramble†
- Cork Hill
- Dyers†
- Elberton
- Fairfield†
- Farm†
- Farrell's†
- Farrell's Yard†
- Gages
- Galway's Estate†
- Harris†
- Hermitage†
- Kinsale
- Lee's
- Molyneux
- Long Ground†
- Morris's†
- North Olveston (since re-settled)
- Old Towne (since re-settled)
- Plymouth – the capital of Montserrat, initially evacuated in August 1995; abandoned and destroyed in 1997†
- Robuscus Mt†
- Saint George's Hill
- Saint Patrick's†
- Salem (since re-settled)
- Soufrière†
- Streatham†
- Weekes
- Woodlands (since re-settled)

†Settlement was destroyed

In addition, the W. H. Bramble Airport was destroyed.

== Activity since 1999 ==
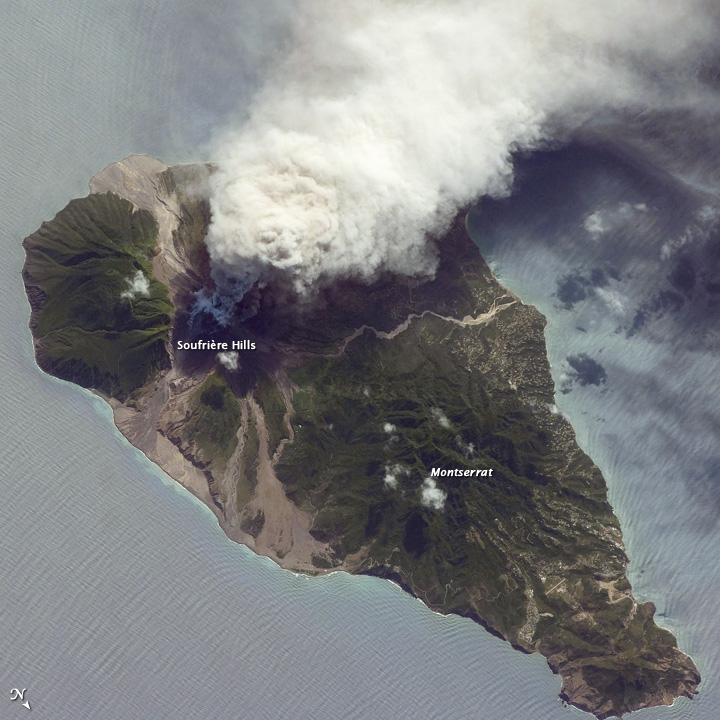
2009 ash and steam plume, Soufrière Hills Volcano. Grey deposits that include pyroclastic flows and volcanic mudflows (lahars) are visible extending from the volcano toward the coastline. NASA ISS photo, 11 October 2009, a view from the northeast looking southwest

False colour satellite image of Soufrière Hills before and after a 2010 partial dome collapse. Red areas are living vegetation, grey areas are covered in volcanic debris

On 24 December 2006, streaks of red from the pyroclastic flows became visible. On 8 January 2007, an evacuation order was issued for areas in the Lower Belham Valley, affecting an additional 100 people.

At 11:27 pm local time on Monday 28 July 2008, an eruption began without any precursory activity. Pyroclastic flow lobes reached Plymouth. These involved juvenile material originating in the collapse of the eruption column. In addition, a small part of the eastern side of the lava dome collapsed, generating a pyroclastic flow in Tar River Valley. Several large explosions were registered, with the largest at approximately 11:38 pm. The height of the ash column was estimated at 12,000 m (40,000 ft) above sea level.

The volcano has become one of the most closely monitored volcanoes in the world since its eruption began, with the Montserrat Volcano Observatory taking detailed measurements and reporting on its activity to the government and population of Montserrat. The observatory is operated by the British Geological Survey, under contract to the government of Montserrat.

The 9 October 2008 issue of the journal Science suggested that two interconnected magma chambers lie beneath the surface of the volcano on Montserrat – one six kilometres below the surface and the other 12 kilometres (7.5 mi) below the surface. The journal also showed a link between surface behaviour and the size of the deeper magma chamber.

On 5 February 2010, a vulcanian explosion simultaneously propelled pyroclastic flows down several sides of the mountain, and on 11 February 2010, a partial collapse of the lava dome sent large ash clouds over sections of several nearby islands, including Guadeloupe and Antigua. Inhabited areas of Montserrat itself received very little ash accumulation during either event.

On 12 February 2010, at 1200 UTC/GMT, Meteosat SEVIRI Channel 7 shows the ash plume from the eruption was caught up within the warm sector of a frontal system heading towards western Europe exacerbating two East Atlantic winter storms. Violent storms accompanied by torrential rain and high wind passed over Madeira on 20 February and western Europe on 26–28 February. In Madeira there were at least 48 fatalities and damage to infrastructure at a total estimated cost of 4 billion Euros. The storm landfalling in western France (named 'Cyclone Xynthia') resulted in at least 63 fatalities and estimated damage within the range of 1.3-3 billion Euros.

== In popular culture ==
- Jimmy Buffett's song "Volcano" and album of the same title are named for Soufrière Hills, and the album's cover artwork features a drawing of smoke spewing from the volcano's summit. Buffett recorded the album at AIR Studios in the town of Salem on the island in 1979 and drew inspiration for the song from relaxing at a hot spring at the volcano's base. The studio was damaged by Hurricane Hugo in 1989 and never reopened.
- Season 3, episode 13 of the National Geographic television documentary programme Seconds from Disaster talks about the events surrounding the eruption.
- Season 9, episode 10 of Law & Order mentions how the eruption of Soufrière Hills has brought an end to the island's tourism.

== Gallery ==
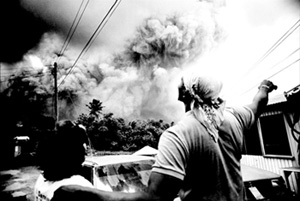
22 September 1997 10:46 a.m. eruption

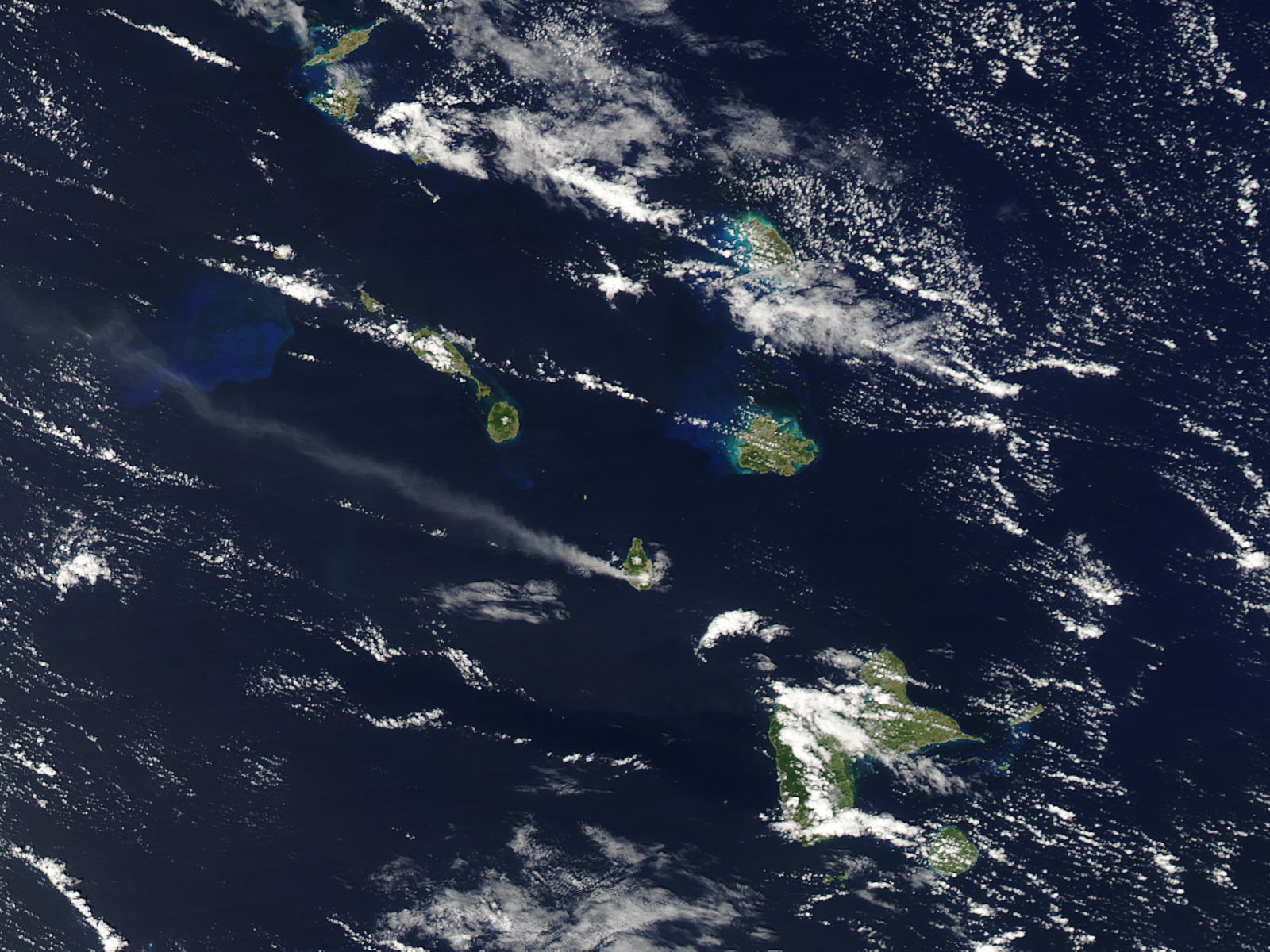
Ash plume from Soufrière Hills, 10 March 2004

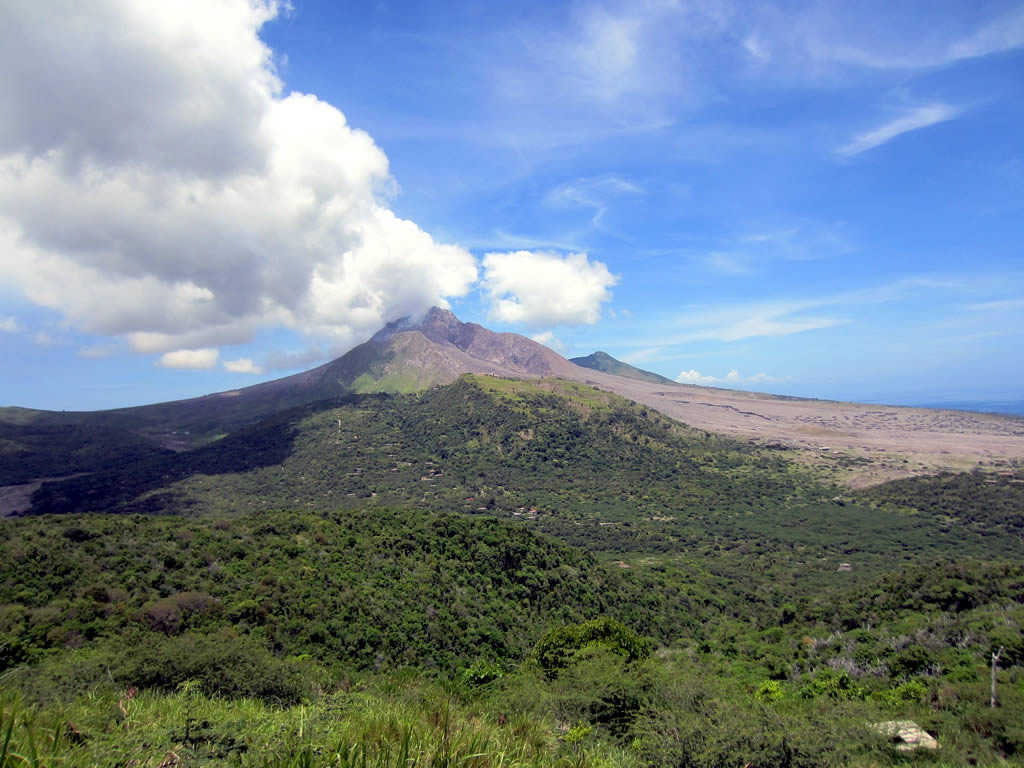
The volcano in 2011

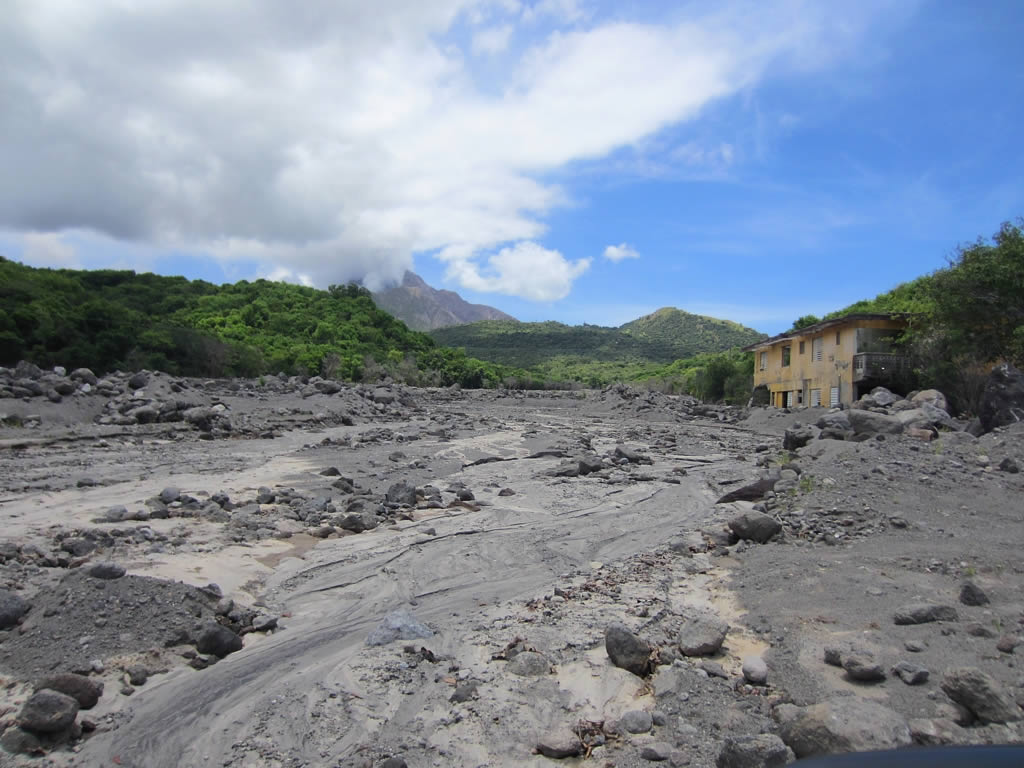
Debris in Belham River Valley in 2011

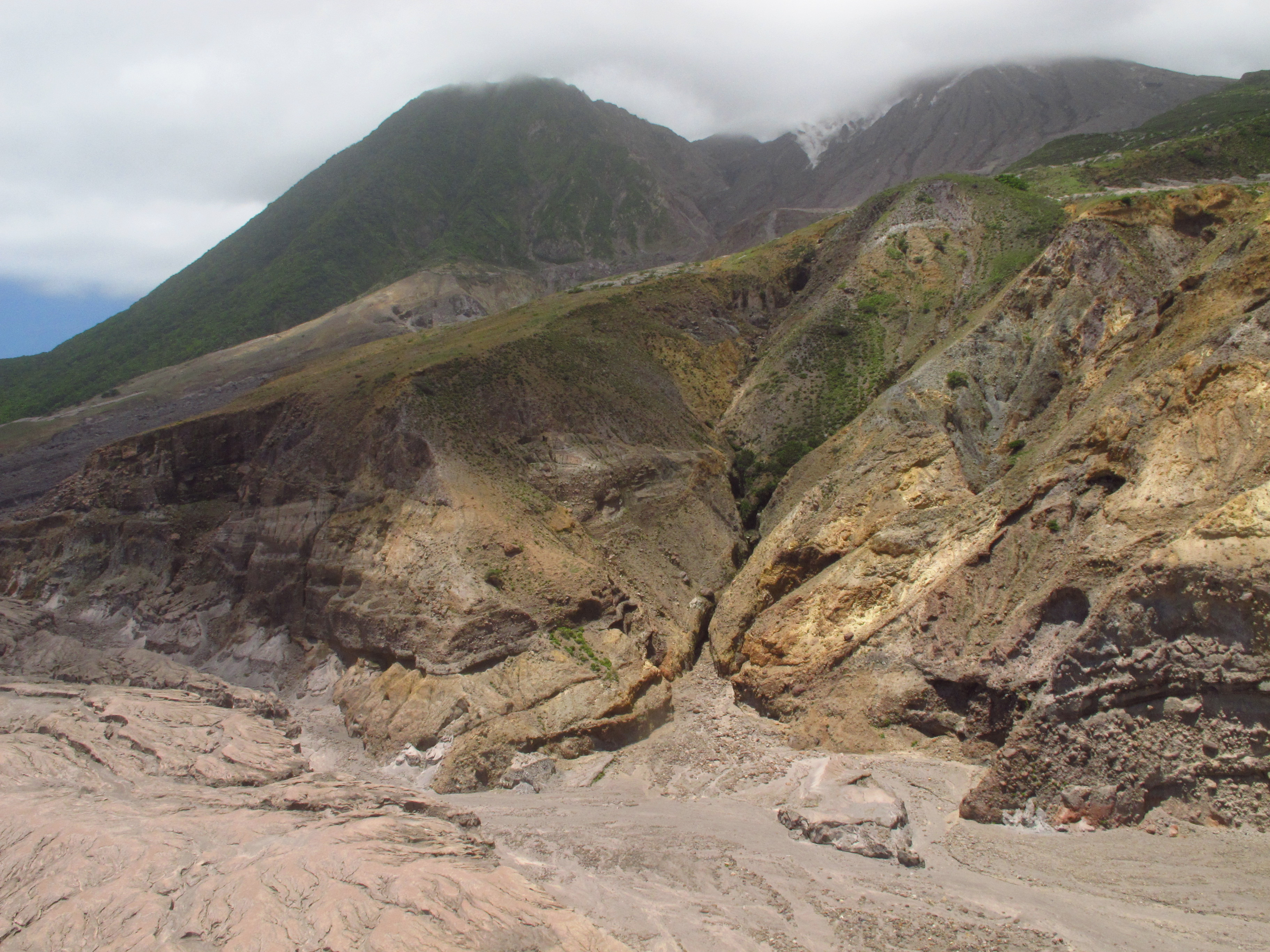
A close-up of the volcano in 2012

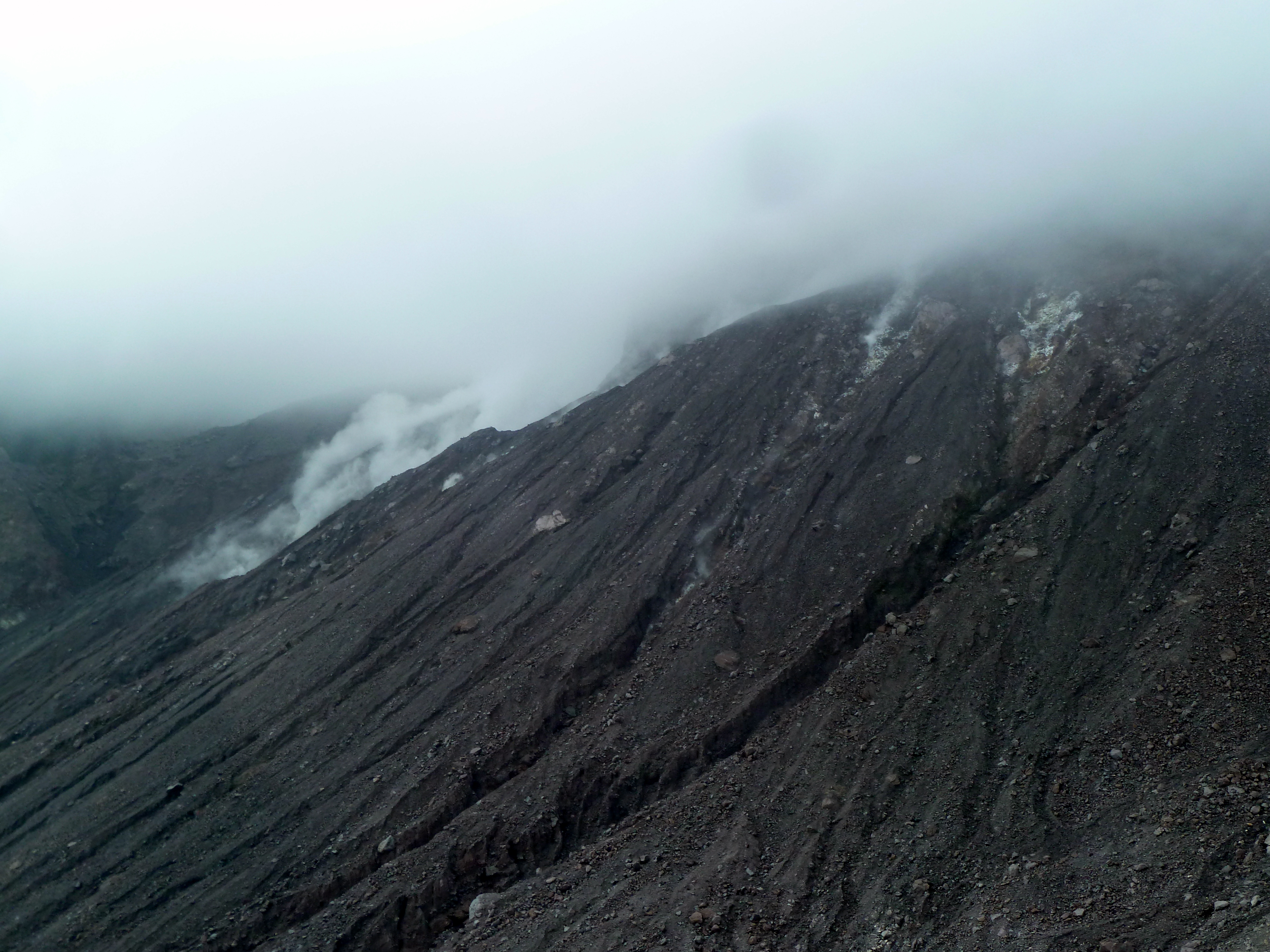
Close-up of the volcano in 2012

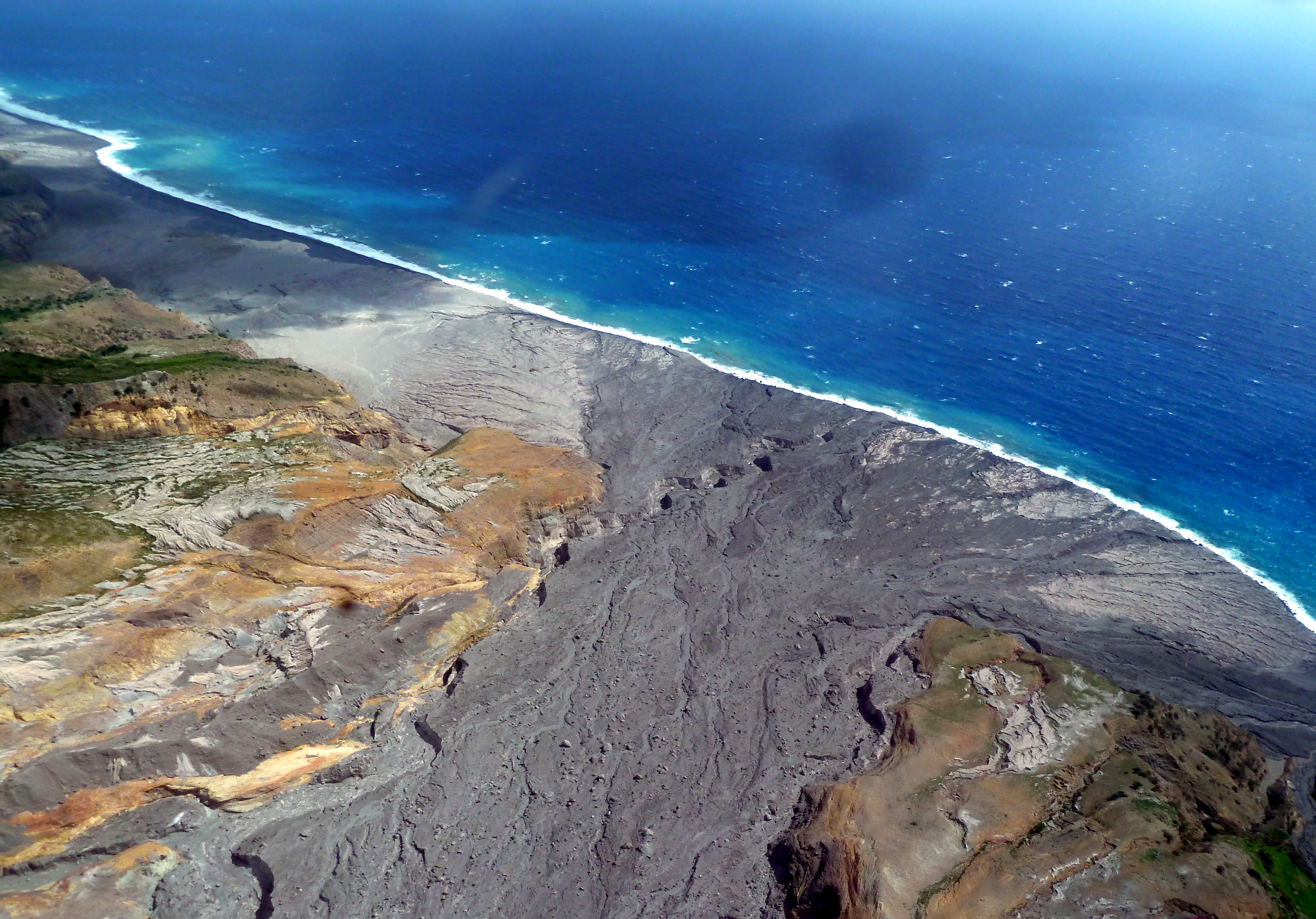
Pyroclastic flow deposits in 2012

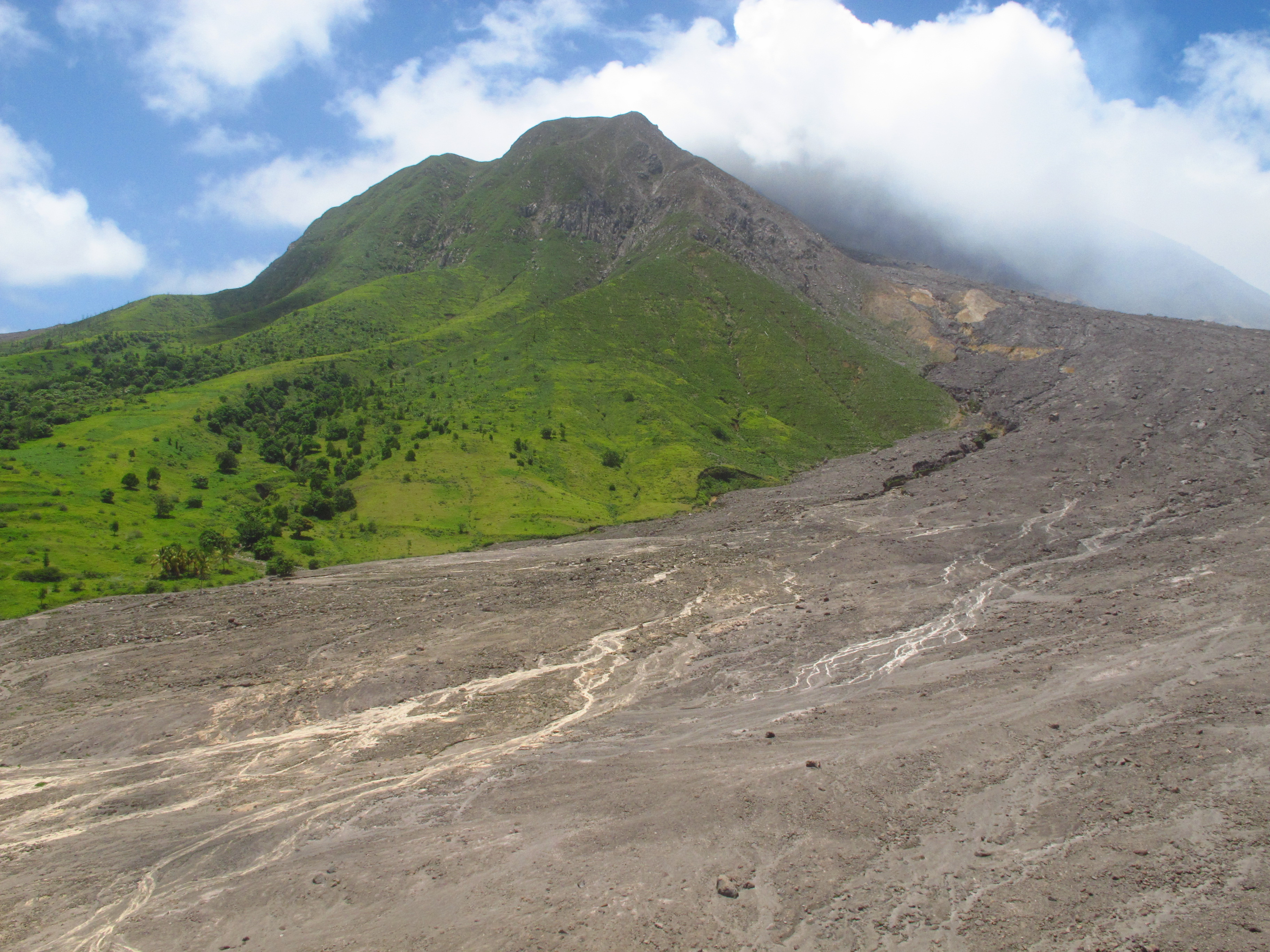
The side of the volcano in 2012, showing the path taken by pyroclastic flows
