= Legislative Council of Montserrat =

The Legislative Council was the unicameral legislature of Montserrat from 1951 to 2011.

== History ==
Universal suffrage was introduced in Montserrat in 1951, with five members elected to the Legislative Council from 1952. Prior to the 1970 elections the number of elected seats was increased to seven.

A new electoral system was introduced for the 2001 elections as a result of the volcanic eruptions rendering four of the seven constituencies uninhabitable. The seven single-member constituencies were replaced with one nine-member constituency in which voters could vote for nine candidates.

A new constitution was introduced in 2011, which abolished the Legislative Council and replaced it with the Legislative Assembly.

== See also ==
- List of speakers of the Legislative Council of Montserrat
