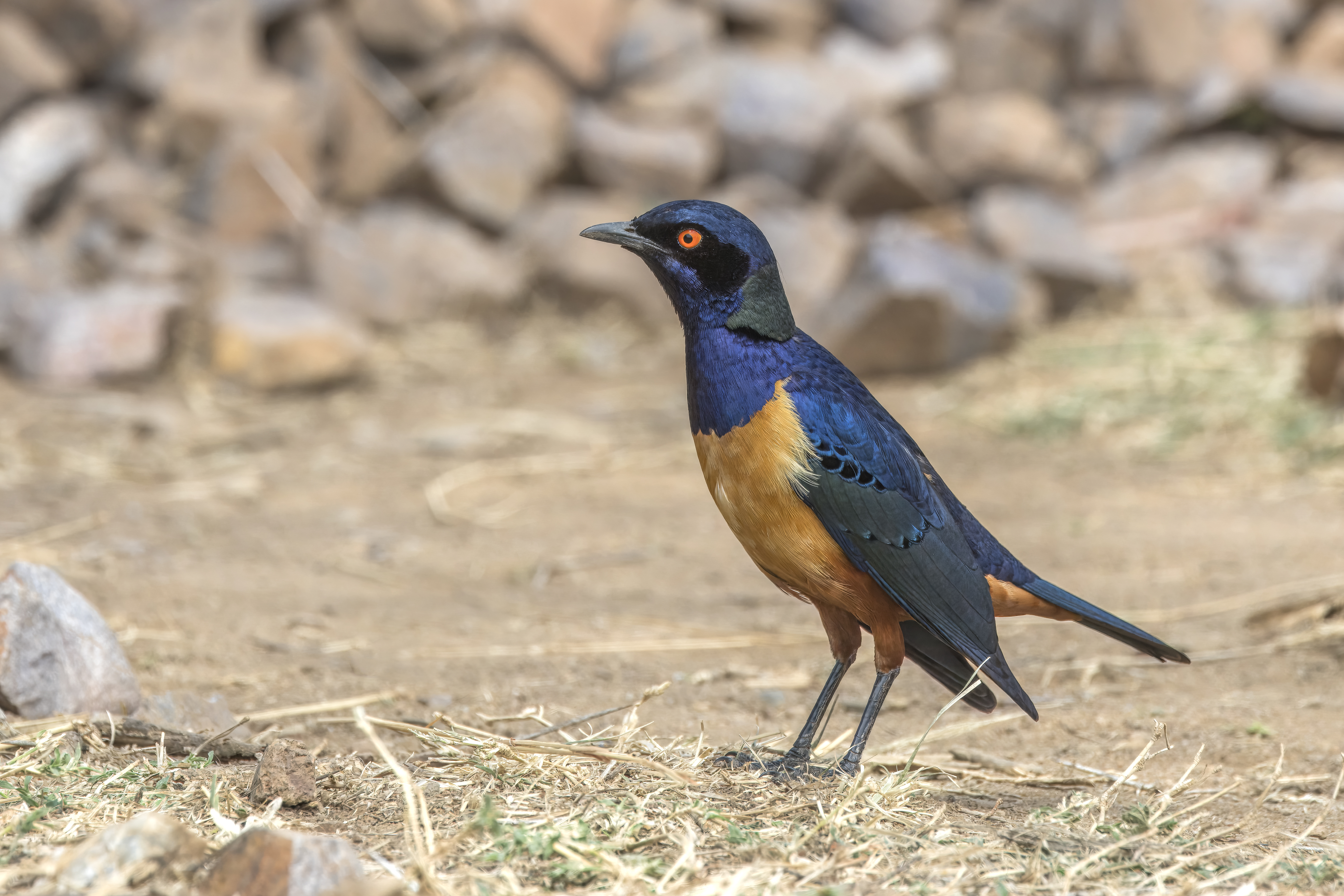
- Serengeti National Park, Tanzania

Conservation status
- Least Concern (IUCN 3.1)

Scientific classification
- Kingdom: Animalia
- Phylum: Chordata
- Class: Aves
- Order: Passeriformes
- Family: Sturnidae
- Genus: Lamprotornis
- Species: L. hildebrandti

Binomial name
- Lamprotornis hildebrandti (Cabanis, 1878)

= Hildebrandt's starling =

Species of bird

Hildebrandt's starling (Lamprotornis hildebrandti) is a species of starling in the family Sturnidae. It forms a superspecies with and has previously been included in the same species as Shelley's starling, a migratory species ranging from Ethiopia and Somalia to Kenya. Both of these species have also been combined into a superspecies with the chestnut-bellied starling of West Africa. It was originally placed in the now defunct genus Notauges. The species is named after Johann Maria Hildebrandt, a German collector who was the first European to obtain specimens.

== Distribution and habitat ==
Hildebrandt's starling is found in Kenya and Tanzania, where it occupies open country between 500 and 2,200 m (1,600 and 7,200 ft). Its habitat is open woodland and open thornbrush country. The species is often recorded as being uncommon, but it varies from being fairly common to fairly uncommon. It is not considered threatened by the IUCN, and is listed as least concern. Its habitat is not threatened and it occurs in a number of protected areas.

== Description ==
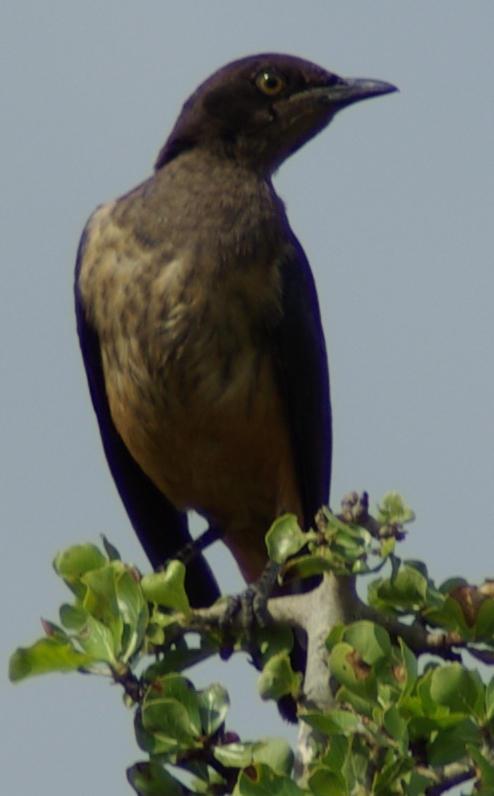
Immature in Kenya

Hildebrandt's starling is 18 cm (7.1 in) in length and weighs 50 to 69 g (1.8–2.4 oz). The adult has bright iridescent plumage on its upper body and upper surfaces. As in its relatives, this iridescence is derived from the interference of reflected light from regimented microscopic feather structures and not from pigments. The head is blue as are most of the upperparts, the wings are bronze-green with blue primaries, the throat and upper breast are glossy purple, and the tail is glossy blue-green. The middle breast and upper belly are orange-buff and the lower belly is rufous. The iris is orange-red, and the bill and legs are black. Male and female adults are identical in external appearance. Can be confused with the superb starling. The juveniles are quite different, with charcoal grey upperparts and chestnut brown lowerparts.

The species makes a number of calls and songs. Its song is a slow low "ch-rak ch-rak chee-chee-wee chee-wee rak rak rak". It also has an alarm call, "chu-ee" and has a contact call, "chule".

== Behaviour ==
The diet of Hildebrandt's starling is a combination of insects and fruit, with insects apparently being the more important constituent. It has been observed feeding on beetles and grasshoppers, as well as hawking for flying termites. Seeds from fruit have also been found in the stomachs of some birds, including those from Carissa edulis, Euclea, Rhus and Apodytes dimidiata. It usually feeds on the ground, in pairs and small flocks, and will readily follow large mammals and catch prey flushed by their movement. It also joins mixed flocks of other starlings.

Hildebrandt's starling is a seasonal nester, with birds nesting in March to May and October to December, although in some parts of Kenya the season is May to July. It usually breeds in pairs but cooperative breeding has been recorded on occasion. It is a cavity nester, usually building its nest of plant fibres in an abandoned woodpecker nest in a tree. Where this is not possible it has been recorded nesting in a hole in a fence post, lamppost or telegraph pole. It competes with the greater blue-eared starling for nesting sites. Little is known about its nesting behaviour, although it is known that the clutch is three to four eggs. Both the parents are involved in feeding the young. The nests of this species are parasitised by the great spotted cuckoo.
