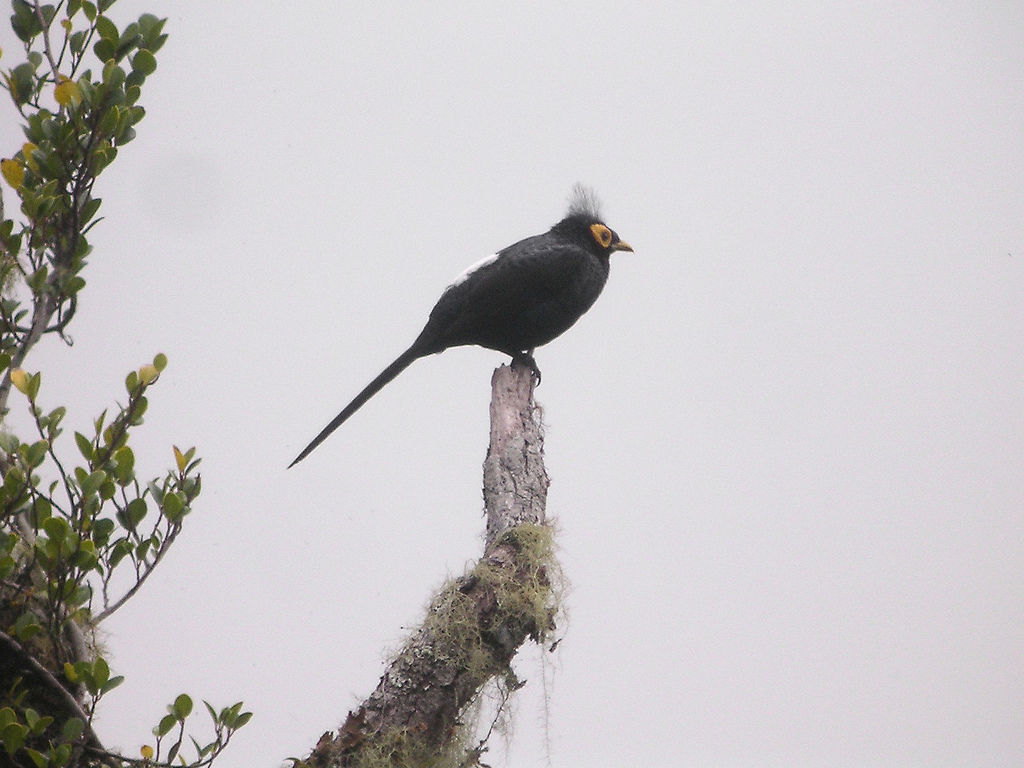

Conservation status
- Near Threatened (IUCN 3.1)

Scientific classification
- Kingdom: Animalia
- Phylum: Chordata
- Class: Aves
- Order: Passeriformes
- Family: Sturnidae
- Genus: Goodfellowia; Hartert, 1903
- Species: G. miranda

Binomial name
- Goodfellowia miranda Hartert, 1903

Synonyms
- Basilornis mirandus

= Apo myna =

Species of bird

The Apo myna (Goodfellowia miranda) is a species of starling in the starling family Sturnidae. The species is also known as the Mount Apo starling or the Mount Apo king starling. It is the only member of the genus Goodfellowia. It is endemic to the Philippines found only in the tropical montane forests of Mindanao. It is threatened by habitat loss.

== Description and taxonomy ==
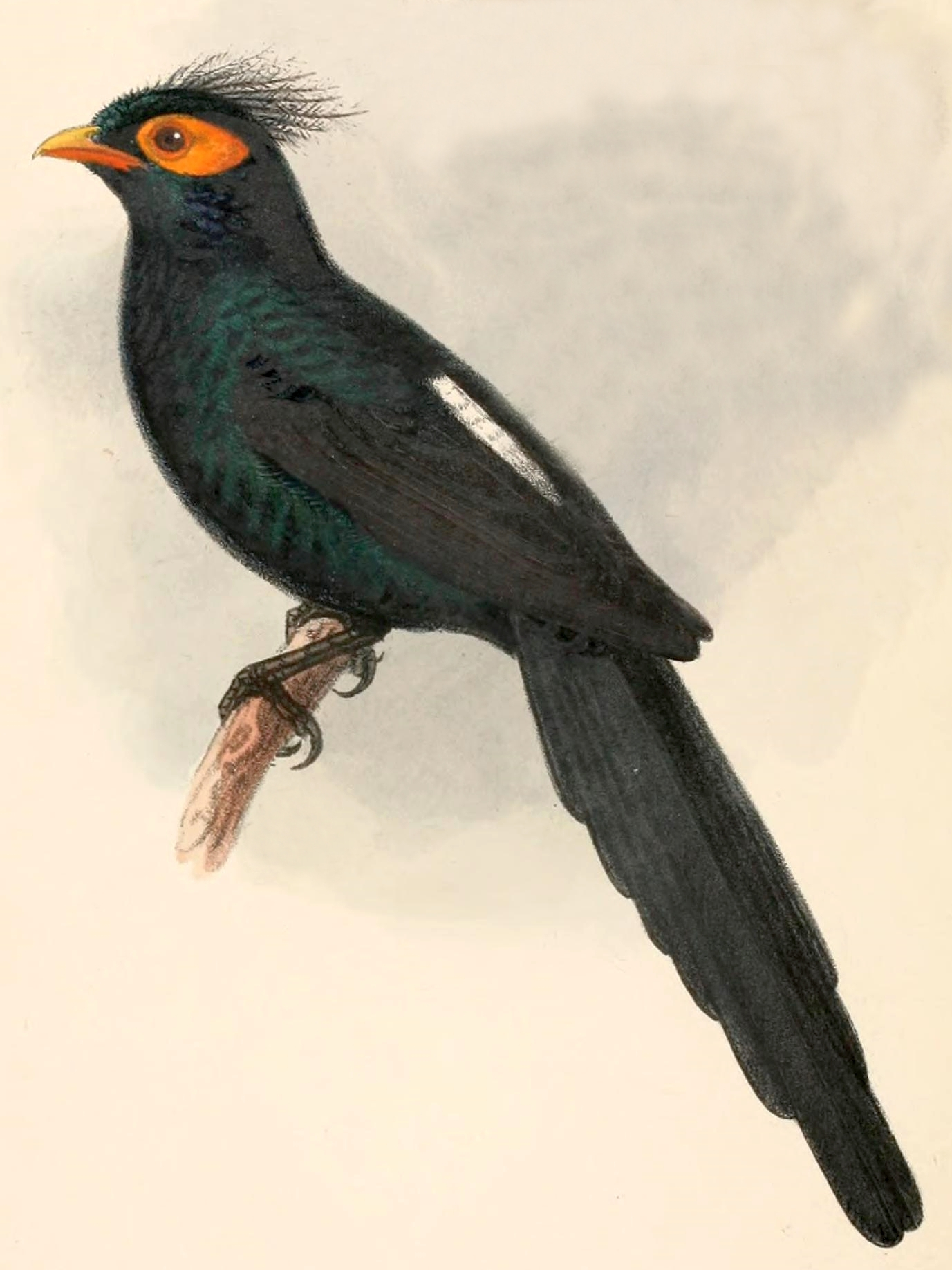
An illustration of an Apo myna

The Apo myna is a long-tailed starling, 30 cm (12 in) long and weighing around 110 g (3.9 oz). The plumage is mostly glossy black, except for the lower back which is white. The feathers on the head are degenerate and form a floppy crest. There is a large patch of bare yellow skin around the eye and on the cheek creating a distinctive mask. The bill and legs are yellowish. Both the sexes are alike. Juvenile birds resemble adults but have less glossy plumage and have a buff edge to the feathers.

The species was formerly classified in the genus Basilornis, but in 2021 the IOC reclassified it into Goodfellowia, the genus it was initially described in, based on the results of phylogenetic studies. The genus name honors ornithologist Walter Goodfellow, while the specific name is Latin for wonderful or strange.

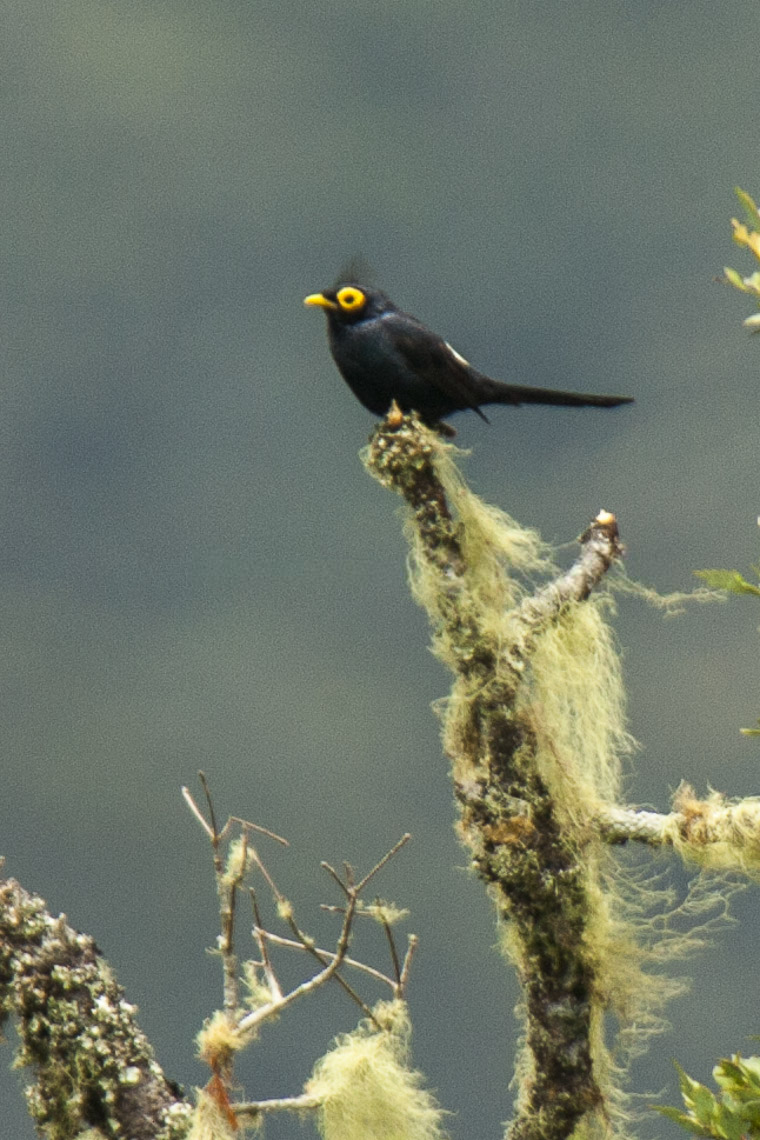
An Apo myna in the wild

== Behaviour and ecology ==
Little is known about the behaviour of this species. It eats berries and insects, and forages singly, as pairs or in small groups. Two nests have been found for this species, both in the holes excavated by woodpeckers into trees. One of these nests was 15 m (49 ft) off the ground and made of twigs and leaves.

They are often seen perching on snags sometimes in flocks of up to 20 to 50 birds mixing with other forest species such as coletos.

== Habitat and conservation status ==
It is endemic to Mindanao in the south Philippines. Its natural habitat tropical is moist montane forests above 1,250 m (4,100 ft). It is assumed that the species is non-migratory.

The Apo myna is listed as near threatened by the IUCN. It is common in some protected areas, but it has a small and fragmented range, and is becoming rare across some of its range. It is relatively secure for the present, as its habitat is remote and rugged. It is still affected by some logging and clearance for agriculture that may have occurred in lower parts of the elevational range. It is also potentially threatened by mining.

Conservation actions proposed include: surveying range to determine current distribution and abundance, as well as assessing the population and impact of habitat loss; conducting ecological studies to improve understanding of its habitat — particularly, its tolerance to habitat degradation; protecting areas of suitable habitat, especially at lower elevations within the species' altitudinal range, and safeguarding against logging and encroachment.
