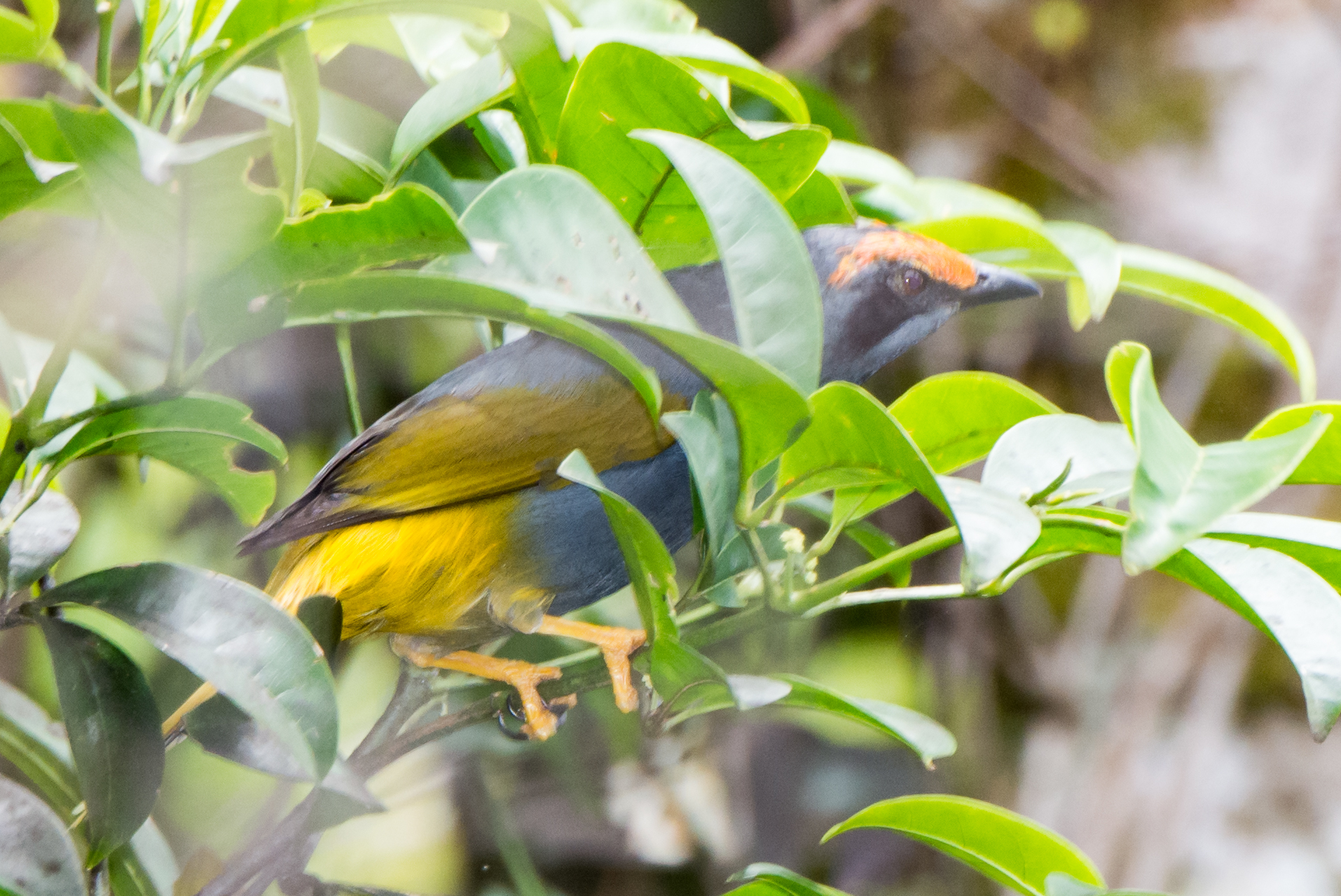

Conservation status
- Least Concern (IUCN 3.1)

Scientific classification
- Kingdom: Animalia
- Phylum: Chordata
- Class: Aves
- Order: Passeriformes
- Family: Sturnidae
- Genus: Enodes; Temminck, 1839
- Species: E. erythrophris

Binomial name
- Enodes erythrophris (Temminck, 1824)

= Fiery-browed starling =

Species of bird

Fiery-browed Myna in Sulawesi

The fiery-browed starling or fiery-browed myna (Enodes erythrophris) is a species of starling in the family Sturnidae. It is monotypic within the genus Enodes. Distinguished by a reddish-orange stripe over the eye, it is endemic to the Indonesian island of Sulawesi, mainly living in humid highland forest.

== Taxonomy ==
Coenraad Jacob Temminck described this species by the name Lamprotornis erythrophris in 1824, and then moved it to the genus Enodes in 1839. It is monotypic within the genus Enodes, being the only species currently recognised. Joseph Harvey Riley described subspecies centralis in 1920, and Erwin Stresemann described subspecies leptorhynchus in 1932. The Handbook of the Birds of the World lists these two subspecies as "provisionally recognized" because they may only be colour variants, while the IOC World Bird List does not recognise any subspecies.

== Description ==
The fiery-browed starling is 27–29 cm (10.6–11.4 in) long. The male and female are similar. The crown, back, throat, breast and belly are dark grey. A bright reddish-orange supercilium starts from the base of the beak and extends over the eye, the feathers behind the eye being black. The flight feathers are brown, their outer webs and the wing coverts covering them being olive-yellow. The rump is golden, and the graduated tail is olive-yellow, with a cream tip. The beak is black, and the legs are yellow.

== Distribution and habitat ==
This species is endemic to the island of Sulawesi in Indonesia. It is found at elevations of 500–2,300 m (1,600–7,500 ft), living mainly in montane rainforest and also in lowland forest, elfin forest and forest edges.

== Behaviour ==
This starling usually occurs in pairs or groups, and sometimes large flocks. It eats invertebrates and fruit, often climbing tree trunks to search for food. Mixed flocks with the Sulawesi myna and grosbeak starling, both also endemic to Sulawesi, have been observed at fruit-bearing trees. Calls recorded include peeep, tik tik and various guttural notes, and the song is a repeated metallic zeek zeek.

== Status ==
This species has a small range, and its population appears to be in decline, but the International Union for Conservation of Nature (IUCN) considers that there are no substantial threats and lists it as a least-concern species.
