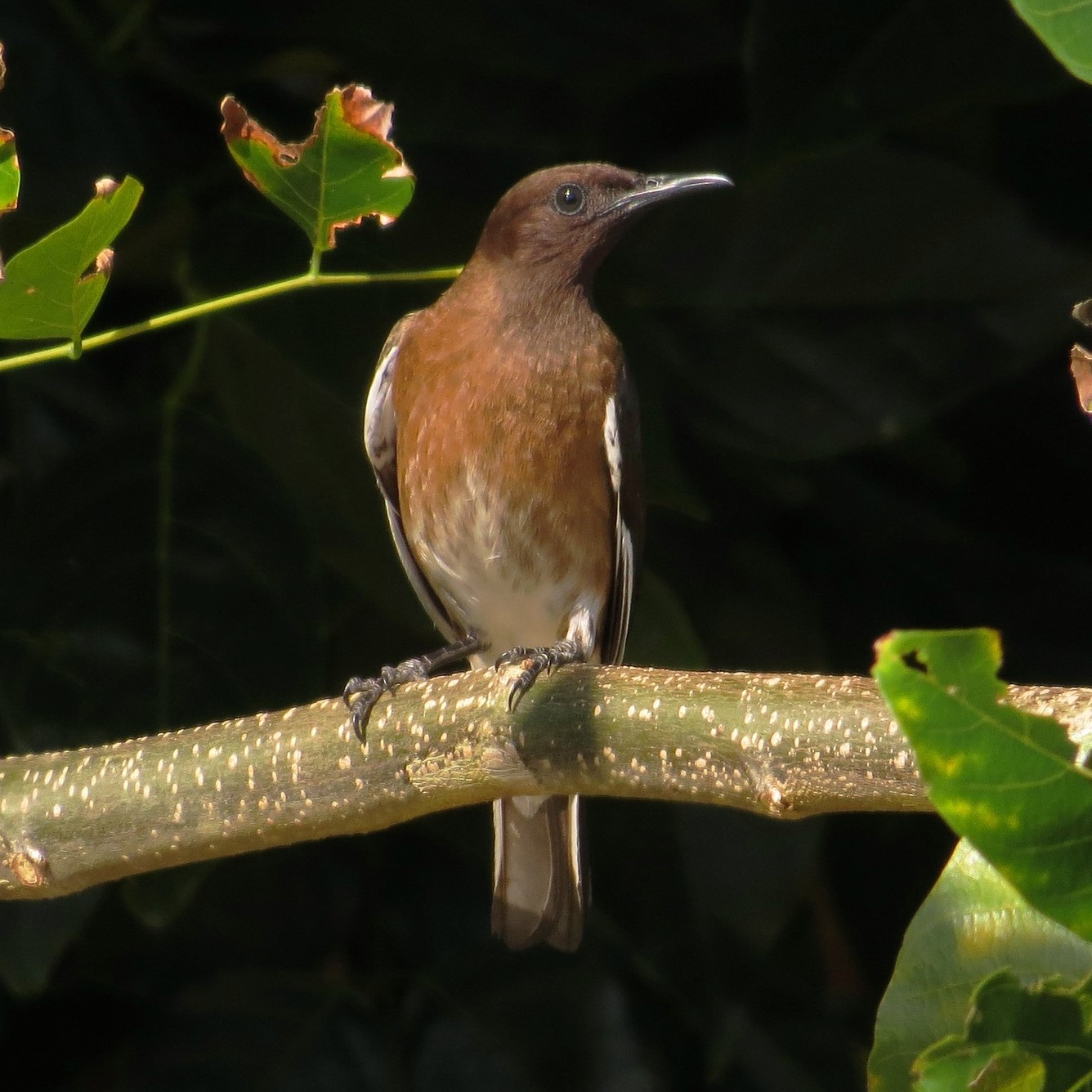

Conservation status
- Least Concern (IUCN 3.1)

Scientific classification
- Kingdom: Animalia
- Phylum: Chordata
- Class: Aves
- Order: Passeriformes
- Family: Sturnidae
- Genus: Hartlaubius; Bonaparte, 1853
- Species: H. auratus

Binomial name
- Hartlaubius auratus (Müller, 1776)
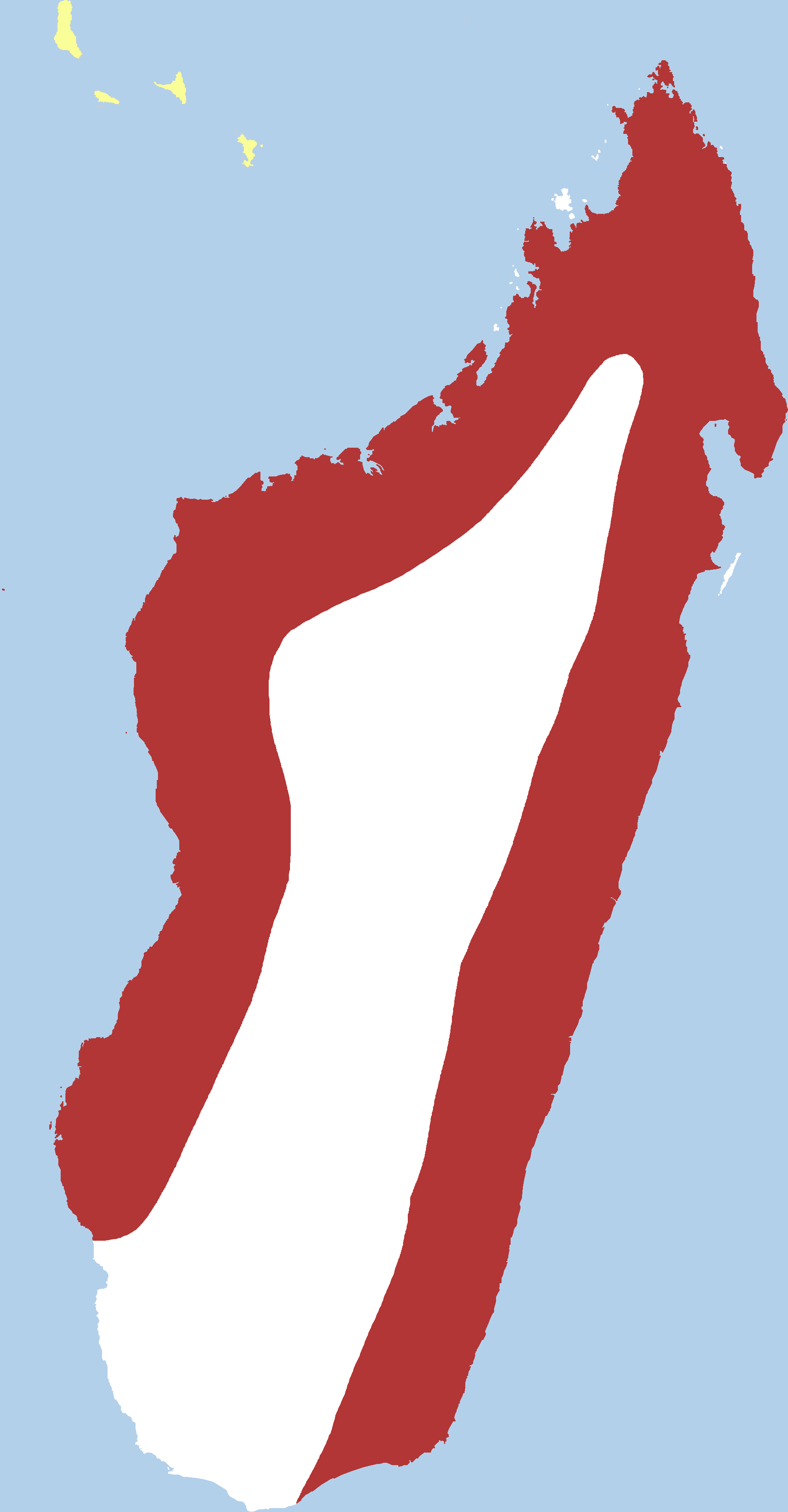
- Distribution of the Madagascan starling

Synonyms
- Saroglossa aurata

= Madagascar starling =

Species of bird

== Introduction ==
The Madagascar starling (Hartlaubius auratus) is a species of starling in the family Sturnidae. It is endemic to Madagascar.

Commonly placed in the monotypic genus Hartlaubius, the Madagascan starling is also sometimes placed in the genus Saroglossa (as Saroglossa aurata), which otherwise only contains the spot-winged starling (S. spilopterus).

The Madagascar Starling often resides in wooded areas, seen eating various fruits and insects, and are a brown colored bird with accents of white and black on different parts of the body.

== Feeding Patterns ==
The Madagascar Starlings diet consists of fruit, insects and nectar. They are often found eating figs, berries, larvae and other items. They forage for these items along the treetops at a forest's edge. As well as finding insects at dung pats. They can be found feeding with a flock of 4-22 and can also be spotted occasionally feeding with other frugivores. Including the Madagascar green pigeon but are rarely seen with insectivores.

== Visual description ==
The average size of the Madagascar Starling is around 20 cm and weighs about 40g. Males have a dark brown head and a lighter brown that spreads across the upper parts of the body. The wings are dark blue with a violet shine to them, and also include a large white stripe on the outer part of the wing and an oval patch on the inner part of the six outermost wing feathers. The tail is a dark blue/green color with a bit of shine. The outer tail feathers have white edges. The brown on the head travels down to the center of the chest with the rest of the chest and sides being of the dark brown color. The under belly, thighs and feathers beneath the tail are white. The bird's eyes are a dark brown color and the beak and legs are black. The female's plumage is less shiny than the males, the top of the head and back of her neck are brown, with lighter edges on the feathers. From the female's chin to chest and sides the feathers are more of a grey-brown color with darker streaks down the middle of each individual feather. Juvenile birds are more similar to the females visual appearance.

== Breeding information ==
The Madagascar Starlings breeding season is from September to november. They are often found nesting in tree holes during this time. Their eggs are of a pale blue color with brown spots.

== Habitat information ==
The Madagascar Starling is often found in humid and wooded areas. Including forest and shrubland ecosystems, and they are found in a terrestrial system. There is concern for the population due to the decrease of their habitat options. It can often be found perched on exposed branches and is almost never seen on the ground.

== Population information ==
The current population of the Madagascar Starling has been declining, but the number of mature individuals is unknown. These birds do not migrate. The generation length of the Madagascar Starling is 4.1 years.
