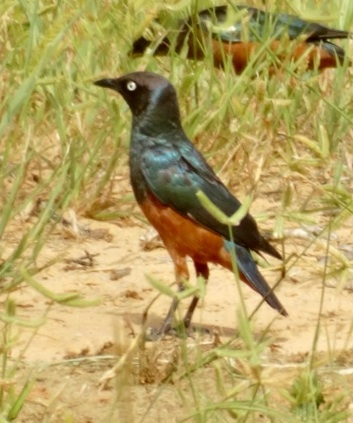
- Belbedji, Niger

Conservation status
- Least Concern (IUCN 3.1)

Scientific classification
- Kingdom: Animalia
- Phylum: Chordata
- Class: Aves
- Order: Passeriformes
- Family: Sturnidae
- Genus: Lamprotornis
- Species: L. pulcher

Binomial name
- Lamprotornis pulcher (Müller, 1776)

= Chestnut-bellied starling =

Species of bird

The chestnut-bellied starling (Lamprotornis pulcher) is a species of starling in the genus Lamprotornis in the family Sturnidae. This is a common resident in arid Sahelian acacia savanna, occurring in Burkina Faso, Cameroon, Chad, Eritrea, Ethiopia, Gambia, Ghana, Guinea, Guinea-Bissau, Ivory Coast, Mali, Mauritania, Niger, Nigeria, Senegal, Sudan, and Togo.

== Description ==
This is one of the rufous-bellied starlings, and the only one in most of its range. The pale eye differentiates it from Hildebrandt's starling and Shelley's starling, while the absence of a white breast band separates it from splendid starling. Predominantly glossy dark-green to blue, with a distinct dark (and not glossy) head and breast.
