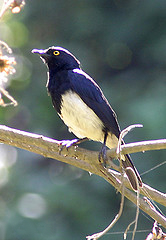
- Male
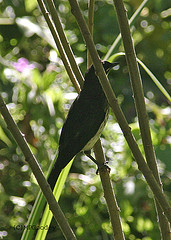
- Female

Conservation status
- Endangered (IUCN 3.1)

Scientific classification
- Kingdom: Animalia
- Phylum: Chordata
- Class: Aves
- Order: Passeriformes
- Family: Sturnidae
- Genus: Arizelopsar; Oberholser, 1905
- Species: A. femoralis

Binomial name
- Arizelopsar femoralis (Richmond, 1897)

Synonyms
- Pholia femoralis Cinnyricinclus femoralis

= Abbott's starling =

Species of bird

Abbott's starling (Arizelopsar femoralis) is a species of starling in the family Sturnidae. It is found in Kenya and Tanzania. Its natural habitat is subtropical or tropical moist montane forests. It is threatened by habitat loss, and its population is estimated at 2500–9999. This species, at 16 to 18 cm (6.3 to 7.1 in) long, is the smallest species of starling. It is in the monotypic genus Arizelopsar.

The name of the species commemorates William Louis Abbott (1860-1936), an American naturalist and collector, who studied the wildlife of the Indo-Malayan region.

== Description ==
Abbott's starling has a black head and breast with white underparts and a yellow eye. Its voice is a musical whistled call moving up and down the scale.

== Diet ==
Abbott's starling feeds on insects and fruit, including the fruit of Cornus volkensii.

== Conservation and status ==
Abbott's starling is listed as endangered by the International Union for Conservation of Nature (IUCN). As of 2020, their population is determined to be decreasing, with an estimated 1,000—2,500 mature individuals in the wild. Deforestation due to illegal logging and agriculture are considered major threats to Abbott's starling.
