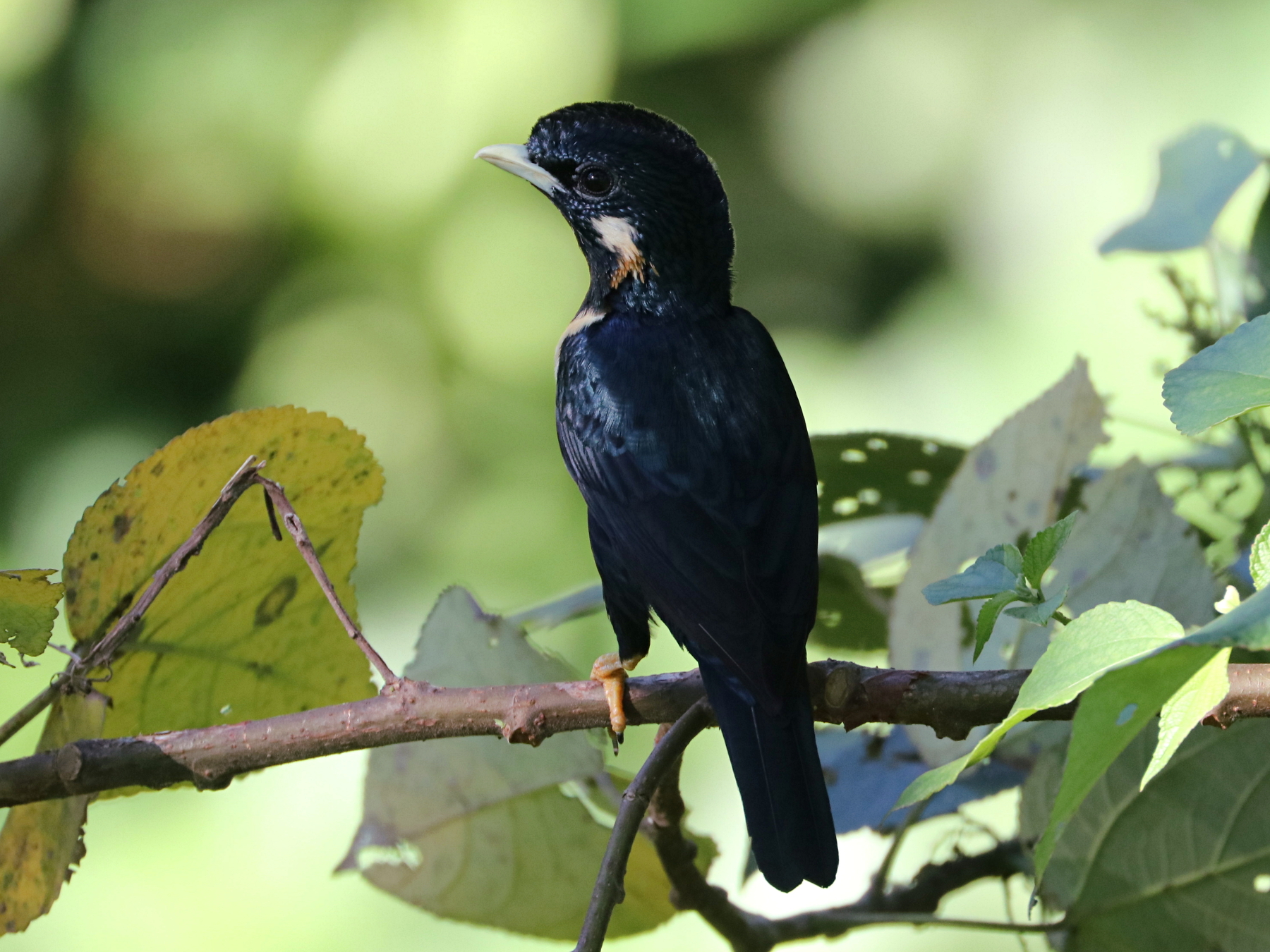

Conservation status
- Least Concern (IUCN 3.1)

Scientific classification
- Kingdom: Animalia
- Phylum: Chordata
- Class: Aves
- Order: Passeriformes
- Family: Sturnidae
- Genus: Basilornis
- Species: B. celebensis

Binomial name
- Basilornis celebensis GR Gray, 1861

= Sulawesi myna =

Species of bird

The Sulawesi myna (Basilornis celebensis) is a species of starling in the family Sturnidae. It is endemic to Sulawesi, Indonesia. Its natural habitat is subtropical or tropical moist lowland forests.

== Description ==
The Sulawesi myna grows to a length of 23 to 27 cm (9.1 to 10.6 in). It is a glossy black bird with a permanently raised crest which is larger in the male. The sides of the face and throat have white patches. The eye is surrounded by a bluish-black ring of bare skin, the beak is pale bluish-green and the legs are yellowish. Juvenile birds are chocolate brown.

This myna has a range of sounds including grunts, high-pitched whistles, squeaks and warbles. One call is a descending sequence of whistles and another is a descending nasal call that sounds like "meeow" and is uttered with the head thrusting forwards and the back feathers fluffed up.

== Distribution and habitat ==
This myna is endemic to the humid forests of hilly districts of the Indonesian island of Sulawesi. Its main habitat here is forest fringes, clearings, scattered areas of woodland and secondary forests, although it is sometimes found in primary forests. It is also present on the smaller islands of Lembeh, Muna and Buton; these are lowland islands and the habitat is mostly grassland savannah with patches of evergreen woodland in which the bird is primarily found.

== Behaviour ==
The species usually feeds high in the forest canopy. It usually occurs in pairs or small family groups, but sometimes solitary individuals can be seen. Immature individuals may join flocks of fiery-browed starling (Enodes erythrophris) and it often associates with groups of other fruit-eating birds.

Little is known about the breeding habits of this bird. Its diet is estimated to consist of about 44% fruit and 52% invertebrates, the balance being taken up by small vertebrates. It is a non-migratory species but presumably moves about the forest in response to the ripening of fruits on different species of tree.

== Status ==
Although B. celebensis is restricted to Sulawesi, it is said to be fairly common. The total population has not been quantified nor is the population trend known, but the International Union for Conservation of Nature has not identified any specific threats and has assessed its conservation status as being of "least concern".
