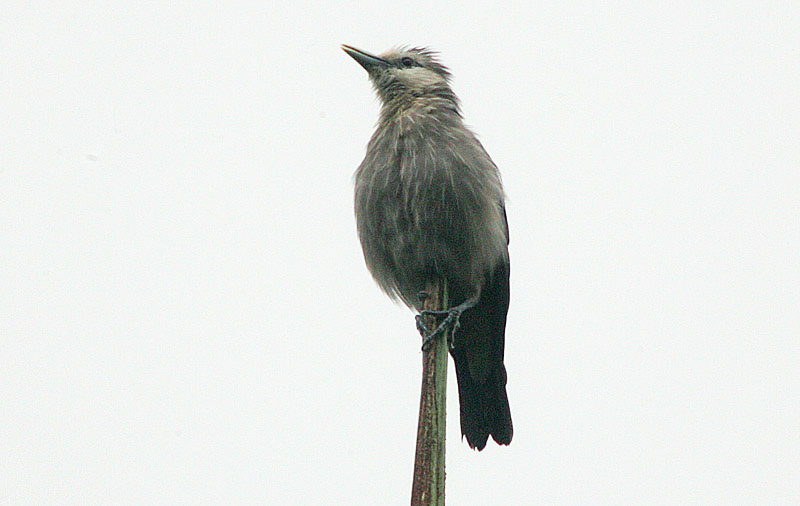

Conservation status
- Vulnerable (IUCN 3.1)

Scientific classification
- Kingdom: Animalia
- Phylum: Chordata
- Class: Aves
- Order: Passeriformes
- Family: Sturnidae
- Genus: Sturnornis; Legge, 1879
- Species: S. albofrontatus

Binomial name
- Sturnornis albofrontatus (Layard, EL, 1854)

Synonyms
- Sturnus albofrontatus Sturnia albofrontata

= White-faced starling =

Species of bird

The white-faced starling (Sturnornis albofrontatus) is a member of the starling family of birds. It is an endemic resident breeder in Sri Lanka.

== Taxonomy ==
The white-faced starling was formally described in 1854 by the English naturalist Edgar Leopold Layard under the binomial name Heterornis albofrontata. This species was previously placed in the genus Sturnus. A molecular phylogenetic study published in 2008 found that the genus was polyphyletic. In the reorganization to create monophyletic genera, the white-faced starling was moved to the resurrected genus Sturnornis that had been introduced in 1879 by William Vincent Legge. The species is monotypic: no subspecies are recognised.

For many years this species was erroneously believed to have been first described in 1850 by French naturalist Charles Lucien Bonaparte under the binomial name Pastor senex. Although Bonaparte had specified the location as Bengal, this was believed to have been an error. An examination in 1997 of the specimen used by Bonaparte revealed that his brief description applied to Sturnus sericeus Gmelin, JF, 1789, the red-billed starling. The earliest description of the white-faced starling is therefore that by Layard in 1854.

== Description ==
The adults of these 22 cm-long birds have green-glossed dark grey upperparts and whitish underparts. The head is paler than the underparts. The sexes are similar, but juveniles are duller, with brown upperparts and greyer underparts.

This passerine is typically found in tall forest, usually high in the canopy. The white-faced starling builds its nest in a hole. The normal clutch is two eggs.

Like most starlings, the white-faced starling is fairly omnivorous, eating fruit, nectar and insects.
