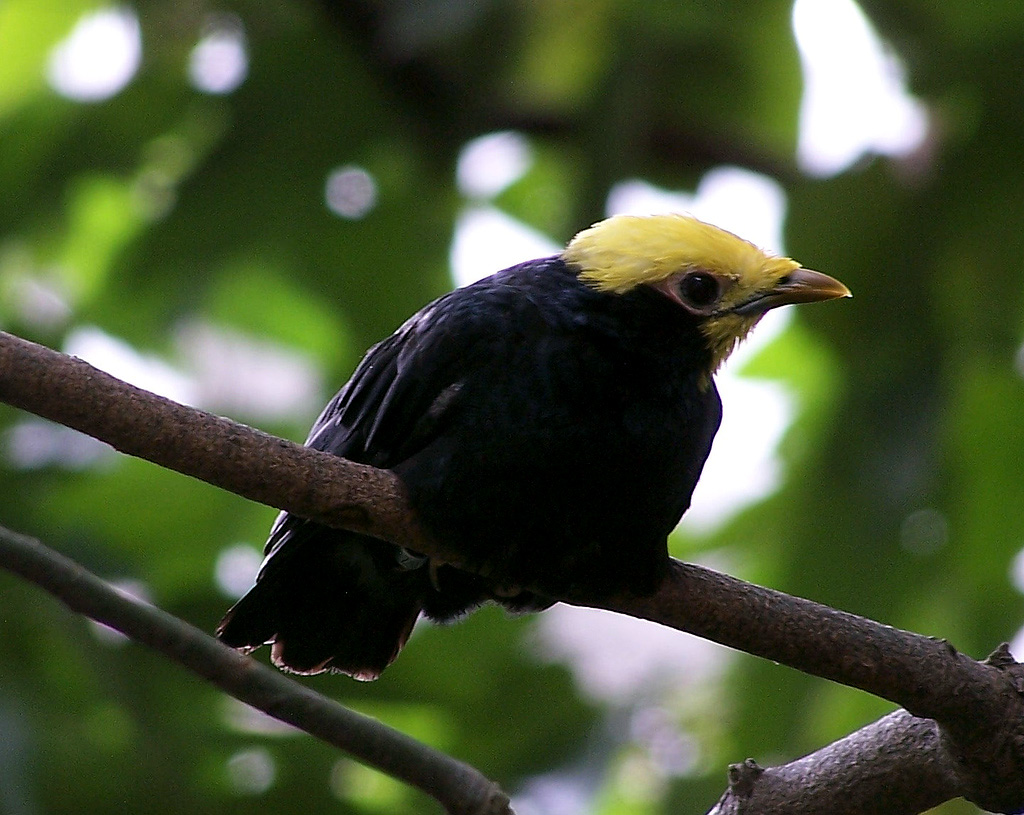

Conservation status
- Least Concern (IUCN 3.1)

Scientific classification
- Kingdom: Animalia
- Phylum: Chordata
- Class: Aves
- Order: Passeriformes
- Family: Sturnidae
- Genus: Ampeliceps; Blyth, 1842
- Species: A. coronatus

Binomial name
- Ampeliceps coronatus Blyth, 1842

= Golden-crested myna =

Species of bird

The golden-crested myna (Ampeliceps coronatus) is a species in the starling and myna family, Sturnidae. It is found from north-eastern India through Indochina and has been introduced to the British Indian Ocean Territory. Its main habitat is subtropical or tropical moist lowland forest, but it is also found in heavily degraded former forest.

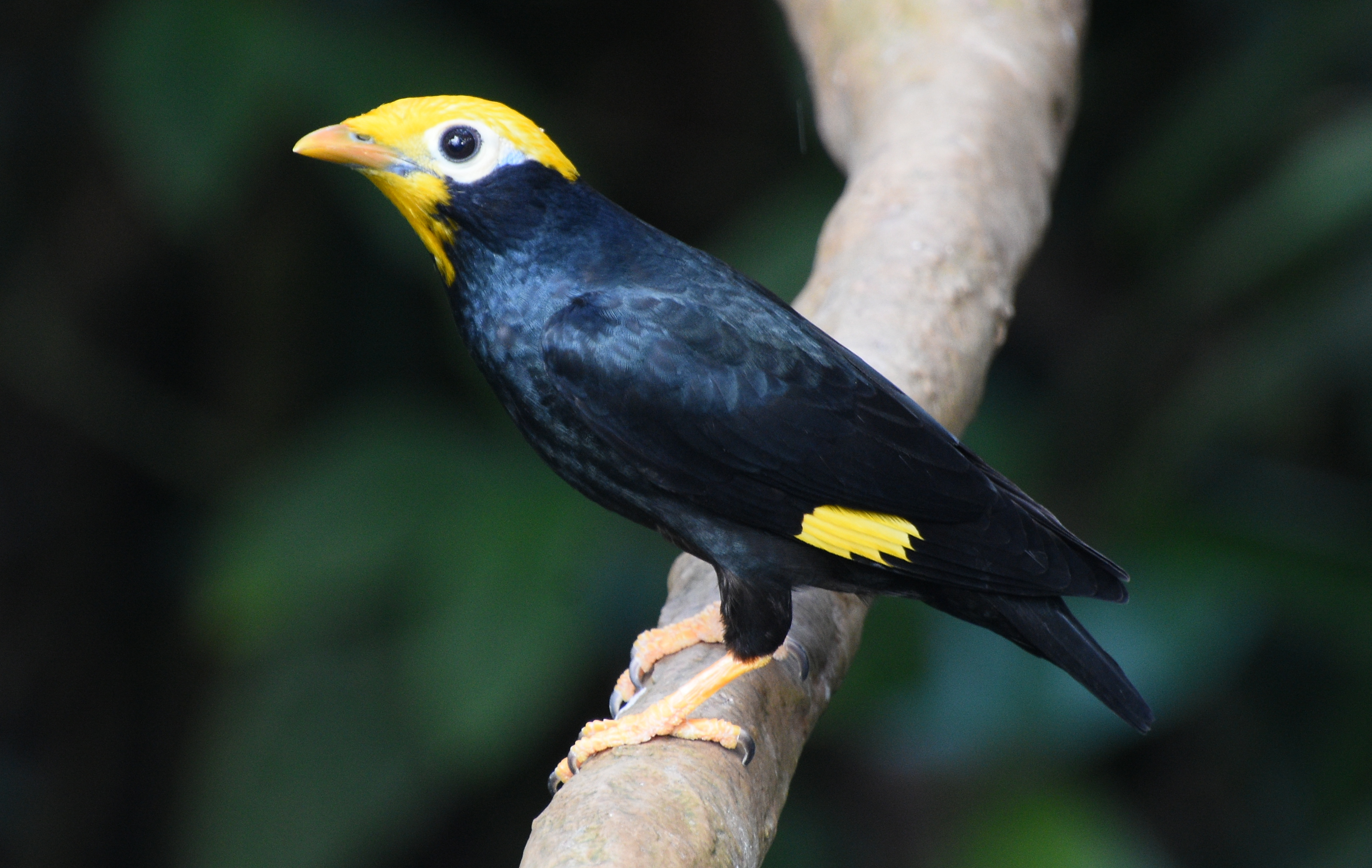
