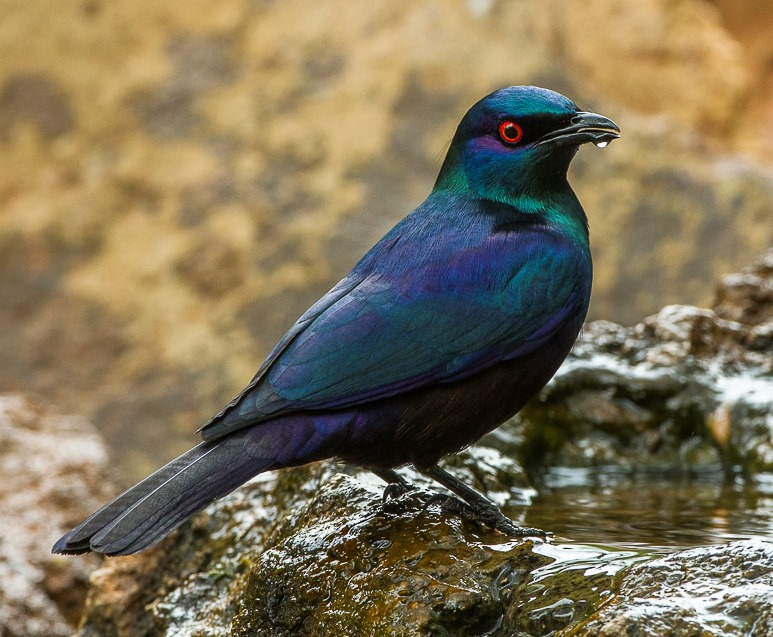
- Nominate subspecies in South Africa

Conservation status
- Least Concern (IUCN 3.1)

Scientific classification
- Kingdom: Animalia
- Phylum: Chordata
- Class: Aves
- Order: Passeriformes
- Family: Sturnidae
- Genus: Notopholia; Roberts, 1922
- Species: N. corusca

Binomial name
- Notopholia corusca (Nordmann, 1835)

Synonyms
- Notopholia corrusca; Lamprotornis corruscus

= Black-bellied starling =

Species of bird

Front view, Zanzibar

The black-bellied starling (Notopholia corusca) is a species of starling in the family Sturnidae, originally described by zoologist Alexander von Nordmann in 1835. It is found in Eswatini, Kenya, Mozambique, Somalia, South Africa, Tanzania, and Zimbabwe.

Their iris color changes by mood or behavior due to fluctuations in blood flow rates.
