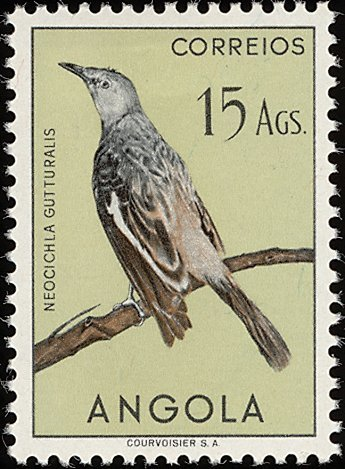
- A stamp worth 15 angolars

Conservation status
- Least Concern (IUCN 3.1)

Scientific classification
- Kingdom: Animalia
- Phylum: Chordata
- Class: Aves
- Order: Passeriformes
- Family: Sturnidae
- Genus: Neocichla; Sharpe, 1876
- Species: N. gutturalis

Binomial name
- Neocichla gutturalis (Barboza du Bocage, 1871)

Synonyms
- Crateropus gutturalis (protonym)

= Babbling starling =

Species of bird

The babbling starling (Neocichla gutturalis) is a species of starling in the family Sturnidae. It is monotypic within the genus Neocichla. It is found in the African countries of Angola, Malawi, Tanzania, and Zambia. The babbling starling is a small starling that consists of yellow, dark brown, grey, and black coloring. There are two subspecies that include the Babbling starling western and the Babbling starling eastern. They are not globally threatened but are poorly known. Their diet can consist of termites, berries, and flowers that are usually on the ground. Their generation length in years is 4.16.

== Taxonomy ==
The babbling starling in part of the Sturnidae family. It has a genus name of Neocichla, which comes from ancient Greek words, translating to new thrush or strange thrush. The babbling starling was originally placed in Crateripus genus by Professor Barboza du Bocage, but changed changed to Neocichla because it differs in shortness of the first primary.

== Habitat and Migration ==
The babbling starling have a general habitat of savannah around open miombo woodland. Their nests consists of moss, grass, or lichen placed up to 8 meters above the ground, where 2-3 eggs will appear. They can be seen traveling in flocks of 40 birds or more. When they are not breeding, they tend to forge flocks and mix with other birds and have an upper elevation limit of 1,500 meters. The breeding time is August through September and October in Angola, and October through November in Zambia and November in Malawi.

== Identification ==
The babbling starlings are 17 cm and 64-72 grams. They can be identified by their yellow chest with a black wedge in the center of their breast and their bright yellow eyes with an off-white colored head and a light brown color on top that fades into dark greyish brown wings that have a dash of white on them forming a band on the folded wing. They have dark brown tails, sexes look alike. The babbling's can also be identified by their slur squealing sounds or rather raspy scolding call.

== Conservation Status ==
The babbling starling is not threatened on a global level, they are poorly known. They have occurred in protected areas.
