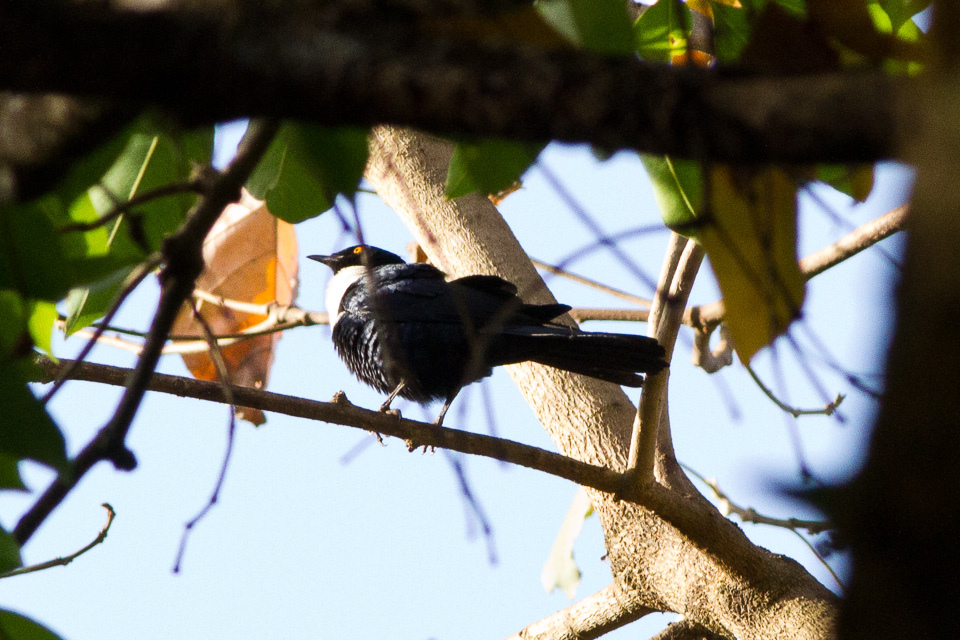
- male perched in a tree.

Conservation status
- Least Concern (IUCN 3.1)

Scientific classification
- Kingdom: Animalia
- Phylum: Chordata
- Class: Aves
- Order: Passeriformes
- Family: Sturnidae
- Genus: Grafisia; Bates, 1926
- Species: G. torquata

Binomial name
- Grafisia torquata (Reichenow, 1909)

= White-collared starling =

Species of bird

The white-collared starling (Grafisia torquata) is a species of starling in the family Sturnidae. It is monotypic within the genus Grafisia. It is found in Cameroon, Central African Republic, Chad, Democratic Republic of the Congo, and Gabon.

== Taxonomy ==
The species was first identified by Anton Reichenow and named Spreo torquatus, from the Latin for "torquated", referring to the coloration around the neck of the male. It was later identified independently by James Chapin in 1913 in the Belgian Congo as Stilbopsar leucothorax, from the Greek λευκός (meaning "white") and θώραξ (meaning "chest"), again referring to its white collar. They were placed into its current genus Grafisia by George Latimer Bates in 1926, based on substantial differences between the white-collared starling and members of either Spreo or Stilbopsar.

== Description ==
White-collared starlings are dimorphic in adulthood, with sexual differences in both size and coloration. Adult males have a glossy-black plumage save for a white patch on the chest which extends up to the wings; their bill and legs are black and a bright yellow iris. Adult females are primarily grey with black-tipped wing and tail feathers; the feathers on its crown and rump have blue-black tips. Juveniles and subadults tend to resemble the female, but with more brownish-grey feathers on their ventral plumage.

The white-collared starling has been reported to have both a chirruping and a call of three short whistled notes.

== Behavior ==
White-collared starlings are generally found in open woodland and seem to stay in the tops of high trees, but have also been reported in montane grasslands in Cameroon They are known to feed on insects, berries, wild figs and the fruit of musanga and macaranga assass trees.

They have been known to travel in pairs or small groups (4-10), and in at least one case in a flock of more than 100 birds in June. Nest-building activity has been observed in March, and males collected at that time were found to have large testes; these facts combined with the appearance of juvenile species between May and July suggest that breeding occurs in the first half of the year. In one instance, a male was seen to make short circular flights from a conspicuous pearch, which was interpreted as a courtship display.
