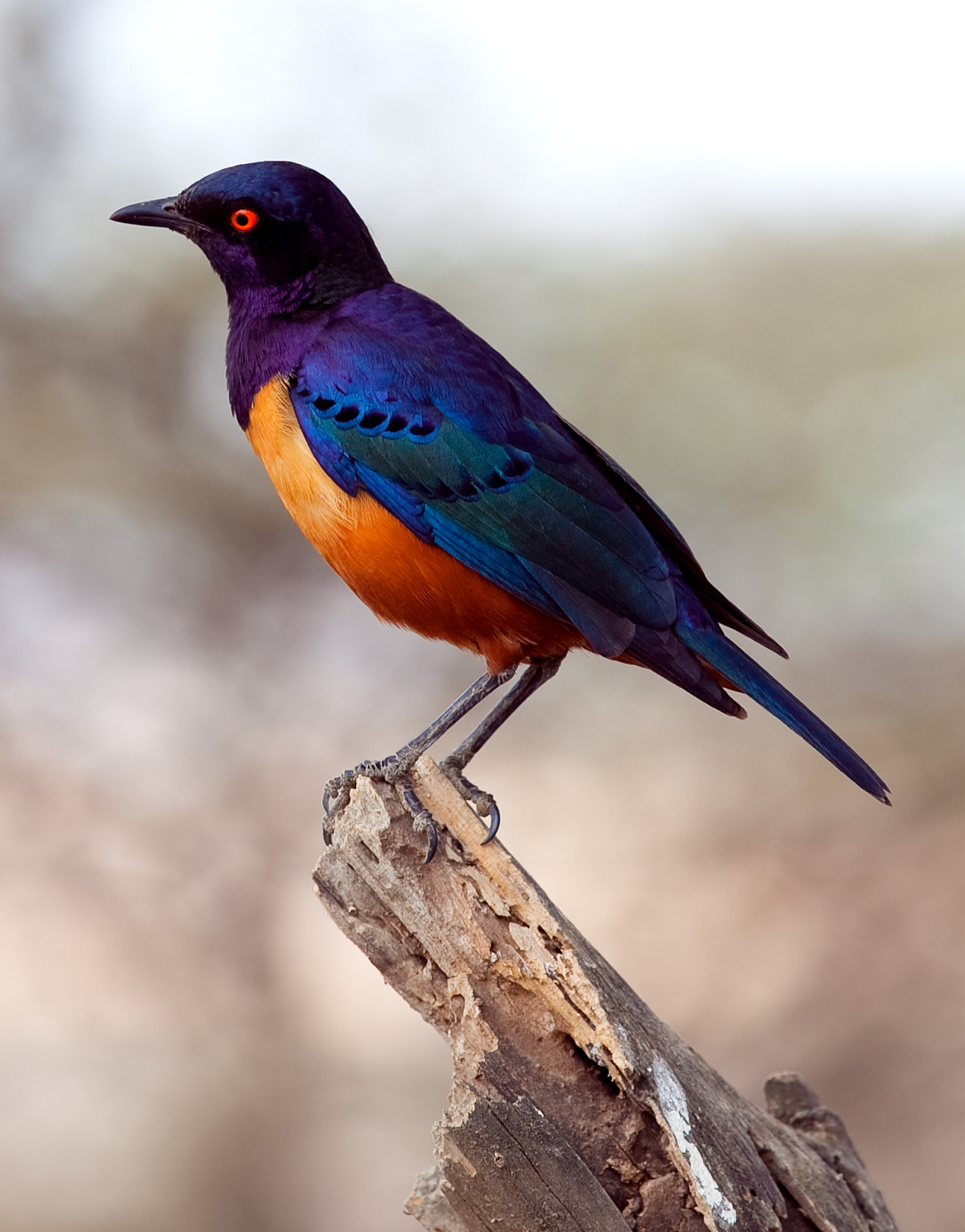
- Hildebrandt's starling (Lamprotornis hildebrandti)

Scientific classification
- Kingdom: Animalia
- Phylum: Chordata
- Class: Aves
- Order: Passeriformes
- Superfamily: Muscicapoidea
- Family: Sturnidae; Rafinesque, 1815

Genera
- Nearly 30, see text.

= Starling =

Family of birds

Starlings are small to medium-sized passerine (perching) birds known for the often dark, glossy iridescent sheen of their plumage; their complex vocalizations including mimicking; and their distinctive, often elaborate swarming behavior, known as murmuration.

All members of the family Sturnidae, commonly called sturnids, are known collectively as starlings. The Sturnidae are named for the genus Sturnus, which in turn comes from the Latin word for starling, sturnus. The family contains 128 species which are divided into 36 genera. Many Asian species, particularly the larger ones, are called mynas, and many African species are known as glossy starlings because of their iridescent plumage. Starlings are native to Europe, Asia, and Africa, as well as northern Australia and the islands of the tropical Pacific. Several European and Asian species have been introduced to these areas, as well as North America, Hawaii, and New Zealand, where they generally compete for habitats with native birds and are considered to be invasive species. The starling species familiar to most people in Europe and North America is the common starling, and throughout much of Asia and the Pacific.

Having strong feet, their flight is strong and direct, and they are very gregarious. Their preferred habitat is fairly open country, they eat insects and fruit, and most species nest in holes and lay blue or white eggs. Several species live around human habitation and are effectively omnivores. Many species search for prey such as grubs by "open-bill probing", that is, forcefully opening the bill after inserting it into a crevice, thus expanding the hole and exposing the prey; this behaviour is referred to as zirkeln (pronounced [ˈtsɪʁkl̩n]), after the German word Zirkel for a pair of compasses.

Starlings have diverse and complex vocalizations and have been known to embed sounds from their surroundings into their own calls, including car alarms and human speech patterns. The birds can recognize particular individuals by their calls and have been the subject of research into the evolution of human language.

== Description ==
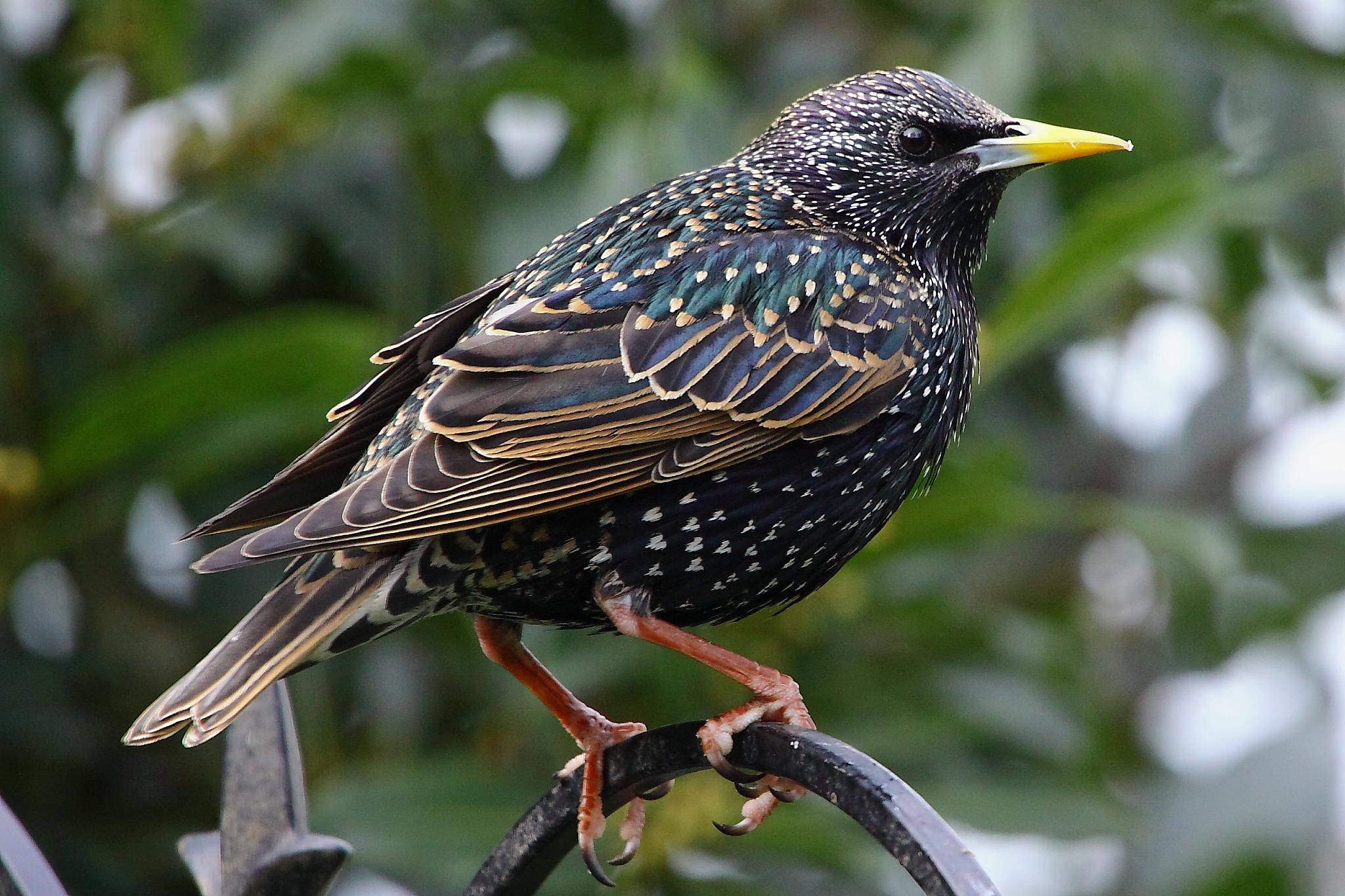
The common starling (Sturnus vulgaris) has iridescent plumage.

Starlings are medium-sized passerines. The shortest-bodied species is Kenrick's starling (Poeoptera kenricki), at 15 cm (6 in), but the lightest-weight species is Abbott's starling (Poeoptera femoralis), which is 34 g (1 1/4 oz). The largest starling, going on standard measurements and perhaps weight, is the Nias hill myna (Gracula robusta). This species can measure up to 36 cm (14 in), and in domestication they can weigh up to 400 g (14 oz). Rivaling the prior species in bulk if not dimensions, the mynas of the genus Mino are also large, especially the yellow-faced (M. dumontii) and long-tailed mynas (M. kreffti). The longest species in the family is the white-necked myna (Streptocitta albicollis), which can measure up to 50 cm (19 1/2 in), although around 60% in this magpie-like species is comprised by its very long tail.

Less sexual dimorphism is seen in plumage, with only 25 species showing such differences between the two sexes. The plumage of the starling is often brightly coloured due to iridescence; this colour is derived from the structure of the feathers, not from any pigment. Some species of Asian starling have crests or erectile feathers on the crest. Other ornamentation includes elongated tail feathers and brightly coloured bare areas on the face. These colours can be derived from pigments, or as in the Bali myna, structural colour, caused by light scattering off parallel collagen fibers. The irises of many species are red and yellow, although those of younger birds are much darker.

== Distribution, habitat and movements ==
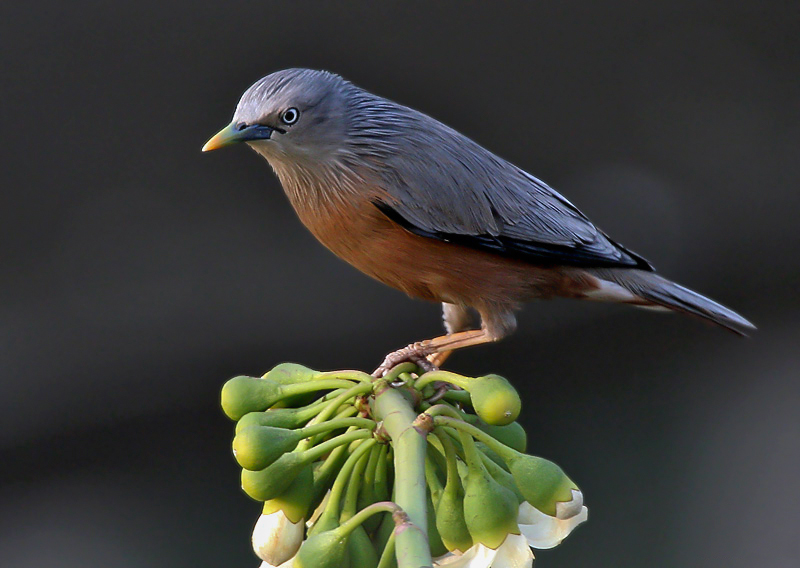
The chestnut-tailed starling is a partial migrant over much of the east of its range, but its movements are poorly understood.

Starlings inhabit a wide range of habitats from the Arctic Circle to the Equator. The only habitats they do not typically occupy are very dry sandy deserts. The family is naturally absent from the Americas and from large parts of Australia, but it is present over the majority of Europe, Africa, and Asia. The genus Aplonis has also spread widely across the islands of the Pacific, reaching Polynesia, Melanesia, and Micronesia (in addition one species in the genus Mino has reached the Solomon Islands). Also, a species of this genus is the only starling found in northern Australia.

Asian species are most common in evergreen forests; 39 species found in Asia are predominantly forest birds as opposed to 24 found in more open or human modified environments. In contrast to this, African species are more likely to be found in open woodlands and savannah; 33 species are open-area specialists compared to 13 true forest species. The high diversity of species found in Asia and Africa is not matched by Europe, which has one widespread (and very common) species and two more restricted species. The European starling is both highly widespread and extremely eclectic in its habitat, occupying most types of open habitat. Like many other starling species, it has also adapted readily to human-modified habitat, including farmland, orchards, plantations, and urban areas.

Some species of starlings are migratory, either entirely, like Shelley's starling, which breeds in Ethiopia and Somaliland and migrates to Kenya, Tanzania, and Somalia, or like the white-shouldered starling, which is migratory in part of its range, but is resident in others.

The European starling was purposely introduced to North America in the 1870s through the 1890s by multiple acclimatisation societies, organizations dedicated to introducing European flora and fauna into North America for cultural and economic reasons. A persistent story alleges that Eugene Schieffelin, chairman of the American Acclimatization Society, decided all birds mentioned by William Shakespeare should be in North America, leading to the introduction of the starling to the U.S.; however, this claim is more fiction than fact. While Schieffelin and other members of the society did release starlings in Central Park in 1890, the birds had already been in the U.S. since at least the mid-1870s, and Schieffelin was not inspired to do so by Shakespeare's works.

== Behavior ==
Starlings imitate a variety of avian species and have a repertoire of about 15–20 distinct imitations. They also imitate a few sounds other than those of wild birds. The calls of abundant species or calls that are simple in frequency structure and show little amplitude modulation are preferentially imitated. Dialects of mimicked sounds can be local.

The Starling's sociality is particularly evident in their roosting behavior; in the nonbreeding season, some roosts can number in the thousands.

=== Murmuration ===
Murmuration of common starlings at Newport Wetlands Nature Reserve, Wales

A highly social bird, most starlings associate in flocks of varying sizes throughout the year and are widely known for a distinctive, often dramatic swarming behavior known as murmuration — a simultaneously synchronized and seemingly random flock movement characterized by sudden, erratic direction changes without an observable leader.

The sharp pushing, pulling, diving, pulsating and swooping of the flock in response to the individual movements may confuse and discourage predators such as falcons, providing a collective protection. The term murmuration derives from the low, indistinct sounds of a dense flock's wings — i.e., the murmur.

Initial study by ornithologist Edmund Selous (1857-1934) sought to explain the murmuration of starlings through the idea of thought-transference. By 2013, physicists in Italy along with mechanical and aerospace engineers working with Princeton University, determined that no single bird could control a flock, and certainly not the movements of more than a thousand birds. Researchers used a computer simulation to determine that each bird synchronized with its seven closest neighbors, creating overlapping groups that communicated their movements — focusing on three simple parameters: attraction, repulsion and angular alignment. Thus the flock moves as each individual bird synchronizes with its nearest group. Researchers also confirmed that a particular shape to the flock formation worked most efficiently for data accuracy — and specifically in starlings, a pancake shape. Thinner, thicker or spherical shapes did not improve performance, rather optimal performance was related to a pancake flock shape.

They noted that "information moves across the flock very quickly and with nearly no degradation," describing it as "a high signal-to-noise ratio" enabled by a bird's very high temporal resolution: they can receive and process certain information more quickly than humans and can "see faster" than humans." Unlike the children's game of telephone where a message is sequentially passed from person to person and very quickly loses information, researchers determined that almost no information is lost across a starling flock.

Starling murmurations can last from a few seconds up to 45 minutes; can involve few birds or up to tens of thousands; may include other species of starlings or species from other families; and sometimes form abstract dramatic shapes, patterns or subtle gradations. In Denmark, where murmurations have been estimated to involve a million starlings, the phenomenon is called the Black Sun, or Sort sol in Danish.

=== Diet and feeding ===
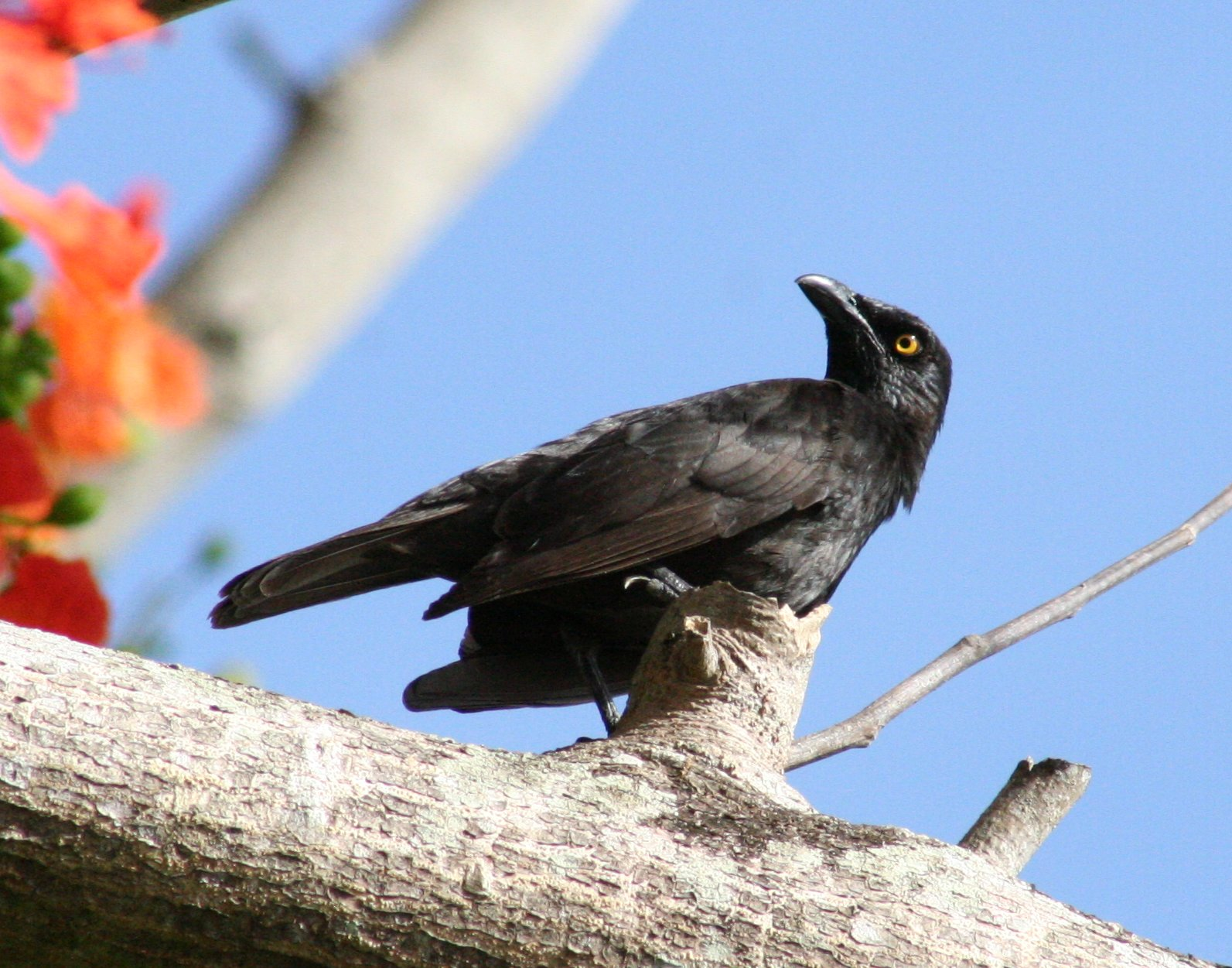
Micronesian starlings have been observed feeding on the eggs of seabirds.

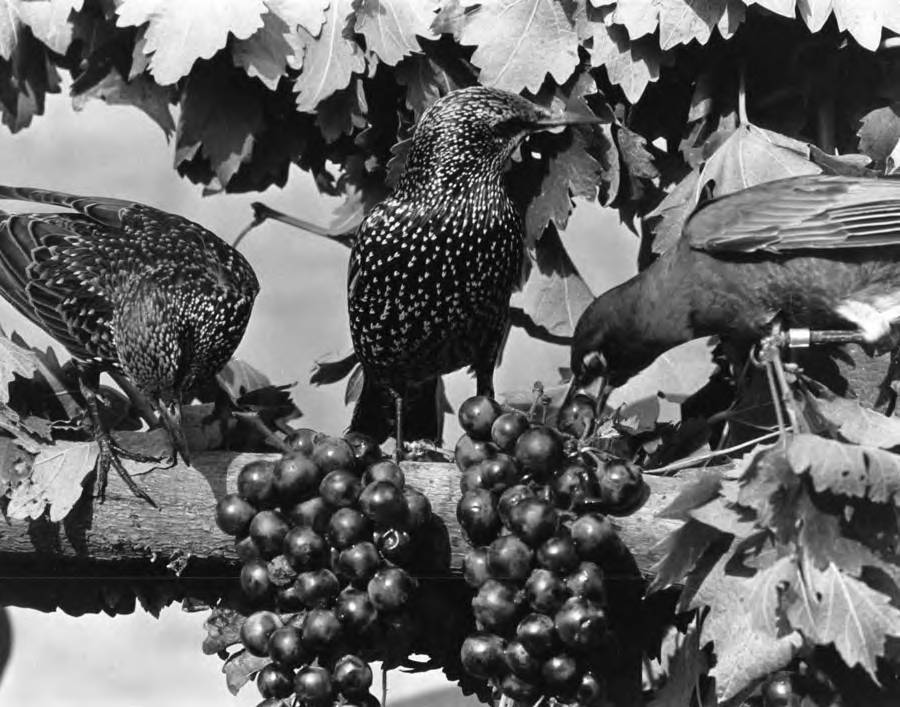
Two starlings and an American robin (right) on grape arbor: The American robin is plucking a grape. Robins and starlings cause serious damage to ripening grapes in California and elsewhere.

The diets of the starlings are usually dominated by fruits and insects. Many species are important dispersers of seeds, in Asia and Africa, for example, white sandalwood and Indian banyan. In addition to trees, they are also important dispersers of parasitic mistletoes. In South Africa, the red-winged starling is an important disperser of the introduced Acacia cyclops. Starlings have been observed feeding on fermenting over-ripe fruit, which led to the speculation that they might become intoxicated by the alcohol.

Laboratory experiments on European starlings have found that they have disposal enzymes that allow them to break down alcohol very quickly. In addition to consuming fruits, many starlings also consume nectar. The extent to which starlings are important pollinators is unknown, but at least some are, such as the slender-billed starling of alpine East Africa, which pollinates giant lobelias.

== Systematics ==
The starling family Sturnidae was introduced (as Sturnidia) by French polymath Constantine Samuel Rafinesque in 1815. The starlings belong to the superfamily Muscicapoidea, together with thrushes, flycatchers and chats, as well as dippers, which are quite distant relatives, and Mimidae (thrashers and mockingbirds). The latter are apparently the Sturnidae's closest living relatives, replace them in the Americas, and have a rather similar but more solitary lifestyle. They are morphologically quite similar too—a partly albinistic specimen of a mimid, mislabelled as to suggest an Old World origin, was for many decades believed to represent an extinct starling (see Rodrigues starling for details).

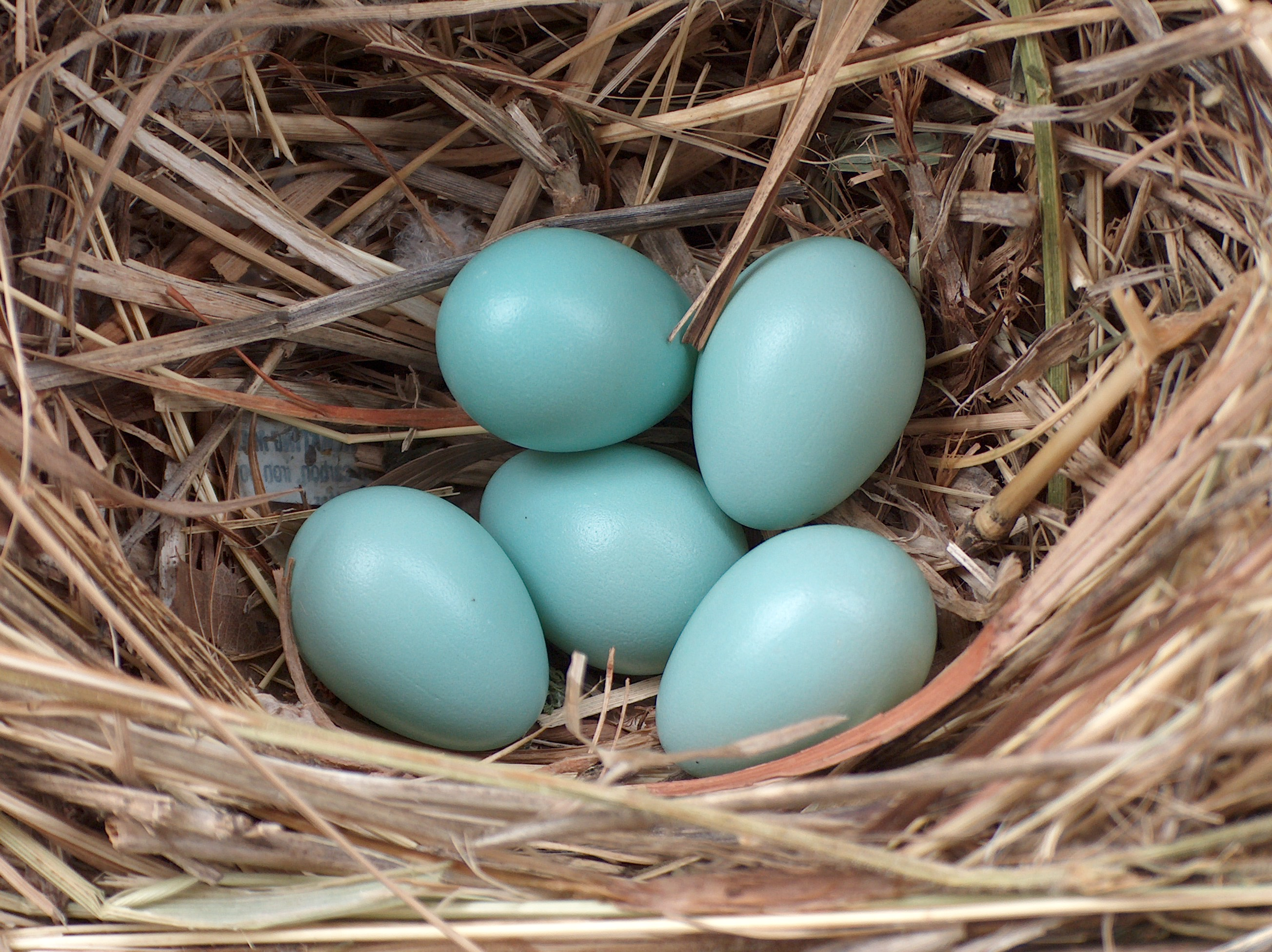
European starling eggs

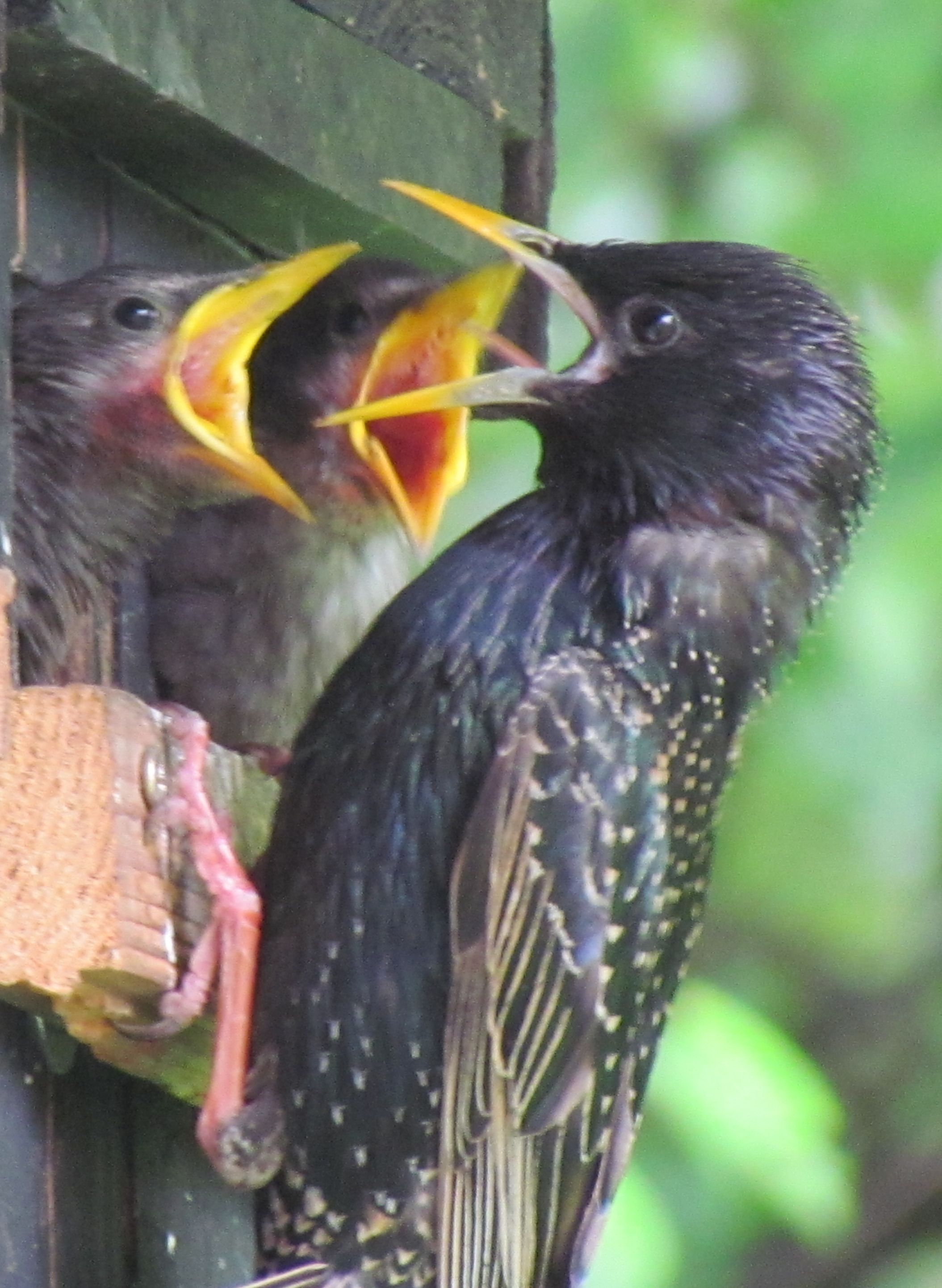
Adult feeding young

The oxpeckers are sometimes placed here as a subfamily, but the weight of evidence has shifted towards granting them full family status as a more basal member of the Sturnidae-Mimidae group, derived from an early expansion into Africa.

Usually, the starlings are considered a family, as is done here. Sibley & Monroe included the mimids in the family and demoted the starlings to tribe rank, as Sturnini. This treatment was used by Zuccon et al. However, the grouping of Sibley & Monroe is overly coarse due to methodological drawbacks of their DNA-DNA hybridization technique and most of their proposed revisions of taxonomic rank have not been accepted (see for example Ciconiiformes). The all-inclusive Sturnidae grouping conveys little information about biogeography, and obscures the evolutionary distinctness of the three lineages. Establishing a valid name for the clade consisting of Sibley/Monroe's "pan-Sturnidae" would nonetheless be desirable to contrast them with the other major lineages of Muscicapoidea.

Starlings probably originated in the general area of East Asia, perhaps towards the southwestern Pacific, as inferred by the number of plesiomorphic lineages to occur there. Expansion into Africa appears to have occurred later, as most derived forms are found there. An alternative scenario would be African origin for the entire "sturnoid" group, with the oxpeckers representing an ancient relict and the mimids arriving in South America. This is contradicted by the North American distribution of the most basal Mimidae.

As the fossil record is limited to quite Recent forms, the proposed Early Miocene (about 25–20 Mya) divergence dates for the "sturnoids" lineages must be considered extremely tentative. Given the overall evidence for the origin of most Passeri families in the first half of the Miocene, it appears to be not too far off the mark, however.

As of 2007, recent studies identified two major clades of this family, corresponding to the generally drab, often striped, largish "atypical mynas" and other mainly Asian-Pacific lineages, and the often smaller, sometimes highly apomorphic taxa which are most common in Africa and the Palearctic, usually have metallic coloration, and in a number of species also bright carotinoid plumage colors on the underside. Inside this latter group, there is a clade consisting of species which, again, are usually not too brightly colored, and which consists of the "typical" myna-Sturnus assemblage.

The Philippine creepers, a single genus of three species of treecreeper-like birds, appear to be highly apomorphic members of the more initial radiation of the Sturnidae. While this may seem odd at first glance, their placement has always been contentious. In addition, biogeography virtually rules out a close relationship of Philippine creepers and treecreepers, as neither the latter nor their close relatives seem to have ever reached Wallacea, let alone the Philippines. Nonetheless, their inclusion in the Sturnidae is not entirely final and eventually, they may remain a separate family.

Genus sequence follows traditional treatments. This is apparently not entirely correct, with Scissirostrum closer to Aplonis than to Gracula, for example, and Acridotheres among the most advanced genera. Too few taxa have yet been studied as regards their relationships, however, thus a change in the sequence has to wait for further studies.

As of 2023, the review by Lovette & Rubenstein (2008) is the most recent work on the phylogeny of the group. This taxonomy is also based on the order of the IOC.

=== Clades ===
Oriental-Australasian clade
Genus	Species	Image
Acridotheres	Great myna (A. grandis); Crested myna (A. cristatellus); Javan myna (A. javanicus); Pale-bellied myna, (A. cinereus); Jungle myna (A. fuscus); Collared myna (A. albocinctus); Bank myna (A. ginginianus); Common myna (A. tristis); Black-winged myna (A. melanopterus); Burmese myna (A. burmannicus); Vinous-breasted myna (A. leucocephalus)	Common myna (A. tristis)
Agropsar (sometimes included in Sturnus or Sturnia)	Daurian starling (A. sturninus); Chestnut-cheeked starling (A. philippinensis)	Daurian starling (A. sturninus)
Ampeliceps	Golden-crested myna (A. coronatus)	Golden-crested myna (A. coronatus)
Aplonis	22 extant, 3 recently extinct	Metallic starling (A. metallica)
Basilornis	Sulawesi myna (B. celebensis); Helmeted myna (B. galeatus); Long-crested myna (B. corythaix)	Sulawesi myna (B. celebensis)
Enodes	Fiery-browed myna (E. erythrophris)	Fiery-browed myna (E. erythrophris)
Goodfellowia	Apo myna (G. miranda)	Apo myna (G. miranda)
Gracula	Sri lanka hill myna (G. ptilogenys); Common hill myna (G. religiosa); Southern hill myna (G. indica); Tenggara hill myna (G. venerata)	Southern hill myna (G. indica)
Gracupica	Black-collared starling (G. nigricollis); Indian pied myna (G. contra); Siamese pied myna (G. floweri); Javan pied myna (G. jalla)	Indian pied myna (G. contra)
Leucopsar	Bali myna (L. rothschildi)	Bali starling (L. rothschildi)
Mino	Yellow-faced myna (M. dumontii); Golden myna (M. anais); Long-tailed myna (M. kreffti)	Yellow-faced myna (M. dumontii)
Sarcops	Coleto (S. calvus)	Coleto (S. calvus)
Scissirostrum	Grosbeak starling (S. dubium)	Grosbeak starling (S. dubium)
Spodiopsar	Red-billed starling (S. sericeus); White-cheeked starling (S. cineraceus)	White-cheeked starling (S. cineraceus)
Streptocitta	White-necked myna (S. albicollis); Bare-eyed myna (S. albertinae)	White-necked myna (S. albicollis)
Sturnia (sometimes included in Sturnus)	White-shouldered starling (S. sinensis); Chestnut-tailed starling (S. malabarica); White-headed starling (S. erythropygia); Malabar starling (S. blythii); Brahminy starling (S. pagodarum)	Brahminy starling (S. pagodarum)
Sturnornis	White-faced starling (S. albofrontatus)	White-faced starling (S. albofrontatus)
†Fregilupus	Hoopoe starling (†F. varius)	Hoopoe starling (†F. varius)
†Necropsar	Rodrigues starling (†N. rodericanus)	Rodrigues starling (†N. rodericanus)

Afrotropical-Palearctic clade
Genus	Species	Image
Arizelopsar	Abbott's starling (A. femoralis)	Abbott's starling (A. femoralis)
Cinnyricinclus	Violet-backed starling (C. leucogaster)	Violet-backed starling (C. leucogaster)
Creatophora	Wattled starling (C. cinerea)	Wattled starling (C. cinerea)
Grafisia	White-collared starling (G. torquata)	White-collared starling (G. torquata)
Hartlaubius	Madagascar starling (H. auratus)	Madagascar starling (H. auratus)
Hylopsar	Purple-headed starling (H. purpureiceps); Copper-tailed starling (H. cupreocauda)	Purple-headed starling (H. purpureiceps)
Lamprotornis (sometimes included in Sturnus)	Cape starling L. nitens); Greater blue-eared starling (L. chalybaeus); Lesser blue-eared starling (L. chloropterus); Miombo blue-eared starling (L. elisabeth); Bronze-tailed starling (L. chalcurus); Splendid starling (L. splendidus); Principe starling (L. ornatus); Emerald starling (L. iris); Purple starling (L. purpureus); Rüppell's starling (L. purpuroptera); Long-tailed glossy starling (L. caudatus); Golden-breasted starling (L. regius); Meves's starling (L. mevesii); Burchell's starling (L. australis); Sharp-tailed starling (L. acuticaudus); Superb starling (L. superbus); Hildebrandt's starling (L. hildebrandti); Shelley's starling (L. shelleyi); Chestnut-bellied starling (L. pulcher); Ashy starling (L. unicolor); Fischer's starling (L. fischeri); Pied starling (L. bicolor); White-crowned starling (L. albicapillus)	Greater blue-eared starling (L. chalybaeus)
Neocichla	Babbling starling (N. gutturalis)	Babbling starling (N. gutturalis)
Notopholia	Black-bellied starling (N. corusca)	Black-bellied starling (N. corusca)
Onychognathus	Red-winged starling (O. morio); Slender-billed starling (O. tenuirostris); Chestnut-winged starling (O. fulgidus); Waller's starling (O. walleri); Somali starling (O. blythii); Socotra starling (O. frater); Tristram's starling (O. tristramii); Pale-winged starling (O. nabouroup); Bristle-crowned starling (O. salvadorii); White-billed starling (O. albirostris); Neumann's starling (O. neumanni)	Red-winged starling (O. morio)
Pastor	Rosy starling (P. roseus)	Rosy starling (P. roseus)
Pholia	Sharpe's starling (P. sharpii)	Sharpe's starling (P. sharpii)
Poeoptera	Kenrick's starling (P. kenricki); Narrow-tailed starling (P. lugubris); Stuhlmann's starling (P. stuhlmanni)	Stuhlmann's starling (P. stuhlmanni)
Saroglossa	Spot-winged starling (S. spilopterus)	Spot-winged starling (S. spilopterus)
Speculipastor	Magpie starling (S. bicolor)	Magpie starling (S. bicolor)
Sturnus	Common starling (S. vulgaris); Spotless starling (S. unicolor)	Common starling (S. vulgaris)

Rhabdornis clade
Genus	Species	Image
Rhabdornis	Stripe-headed rhabdornis (R. mystacalis); Grand rhabdornis (R. grandis); Stripe-breasted rhabdornis (R. inornatus); Visayan rhabdornis (R. rabori)	Grand rhabdornis (R. grandis)

Unresolved
Genus	Species	Image
†Cryptopsar	Mauritius starling (C. ischyrhynchus)	Mauritius starling (C. ischyrhynchus)

The extinct Mascarene starlings were formerly of uncertain relationships, but are now thought to belong to the Oriental-Australasian clade, being allied with the Bali myna. However, while the two more recent species (Fregipilus and Necropsar) have been classified, the prehistoric Cryptopsar has not.
