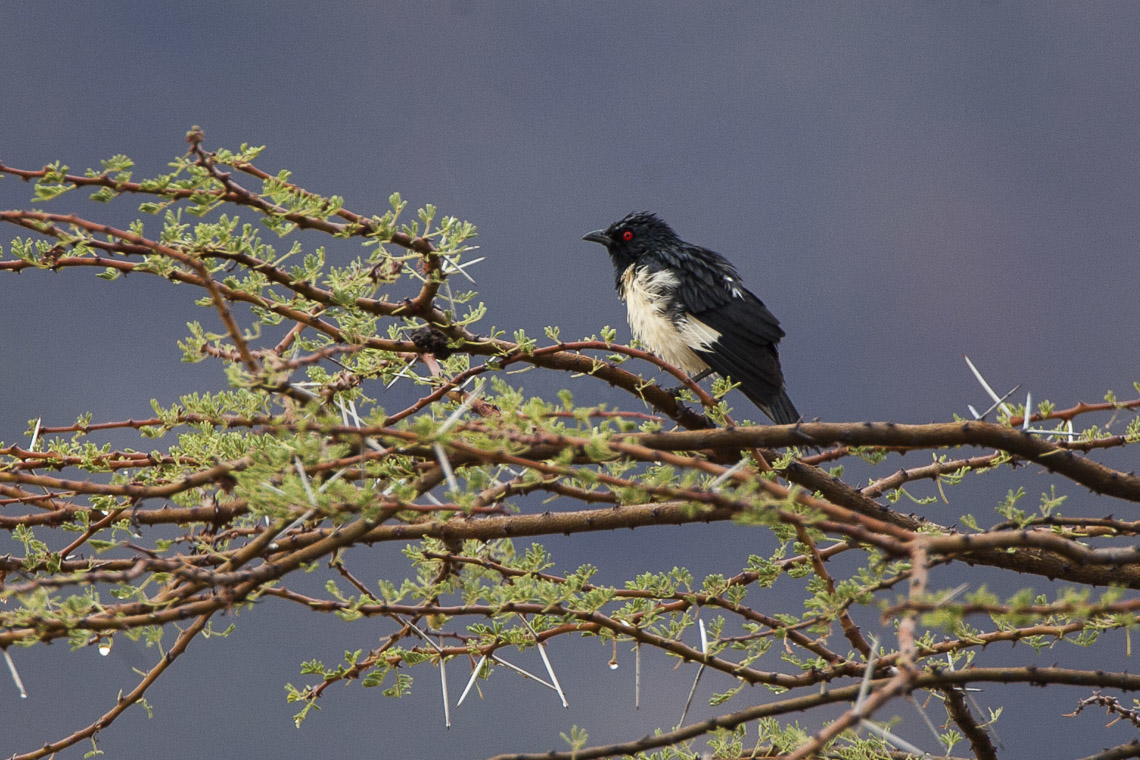
- At Shaba, Kenya

Conservation status
- Least Concern (IUCN 3.1)

Scientific classification
- Kingdom: Animalia
- Phylum: Chordata
- Class: Aves
- Order: Passeriformes
- Family: Sturnidae
- Genus: Speculipastor; Reichenow, 1879
- Species: S. bicolor

Binomial name
- Speculipastor bicolor Reichenow, 1879

= Magpie starling =

Species of bird

The magpie starling (Speculipastor bicolor) is a member of the starling family from eastern Africa.

== Description ==
The magpie starling is about 16–19 cm (6.5–7.5 in) in length. The white patches at base of primaries are obvious in flight. The male is a shiny blue-black on upperparts, head and upper breast, with mostly white below and bloodred eyes. The female is a dull blackish above with dark grey crown, and a dark grey throat is separated from white belly by a glossy black breast band. Her eyes are red or orange-red. The Juvenile is brown with a white belly; eyes brown, becoming orange-red in as the bird matures. Exceptional young birds are entirely white below, including chin and throat.

The call is a prolonged soft babbling quereeeh quaaa kereek quak-quak, suaaaa, cherak-chik-chak...mixed higher harsh notes.

== Distribution and habitat ==
It is a gregarious nomadic pied starling of dry brush and thorn-scrub in northern and eastern Kenya. It is also found in Ethiopia, Somalia, South Sudan, Tanzania, and Uganda.
