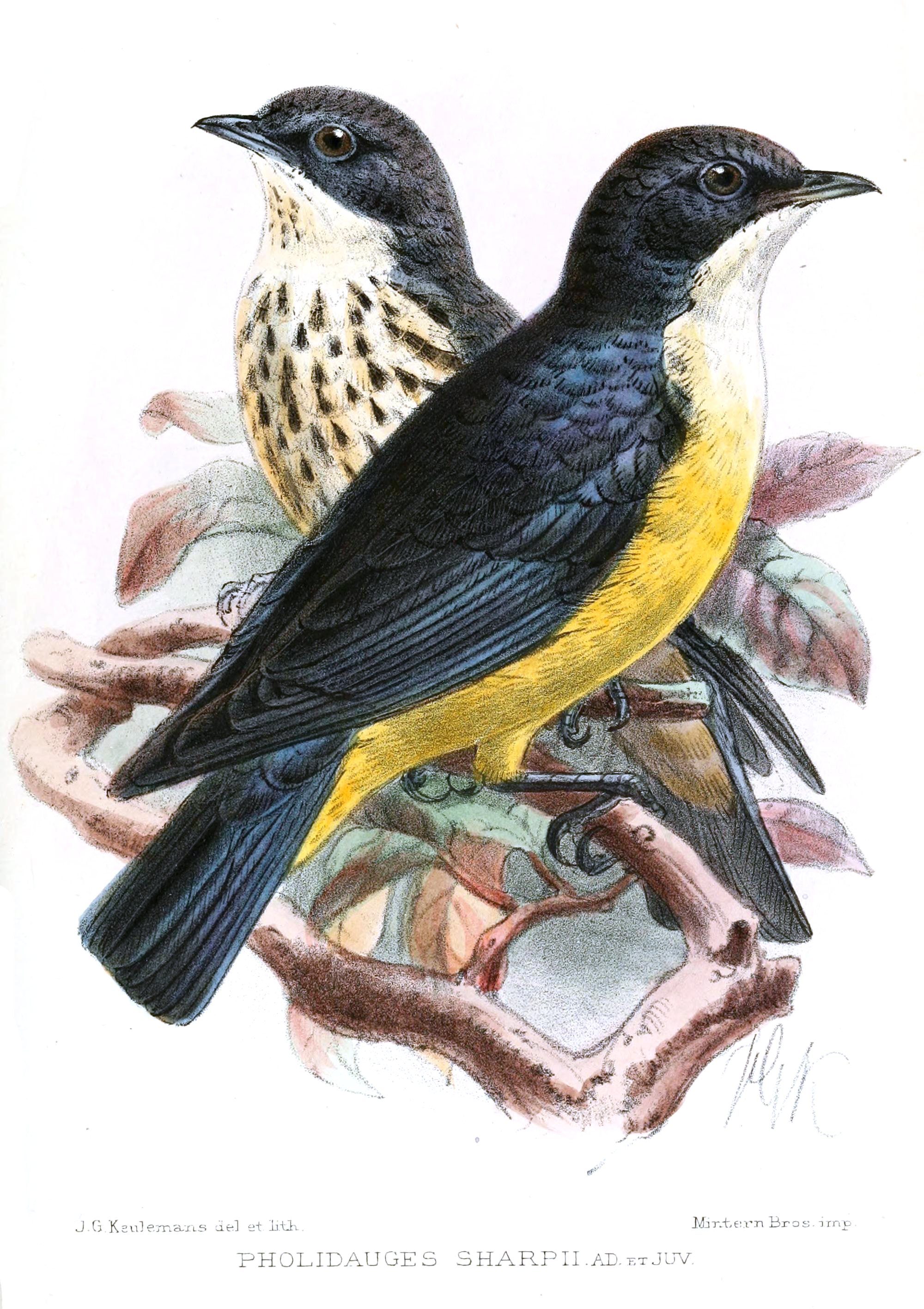
- Illustration by John Gerrard Keulemans
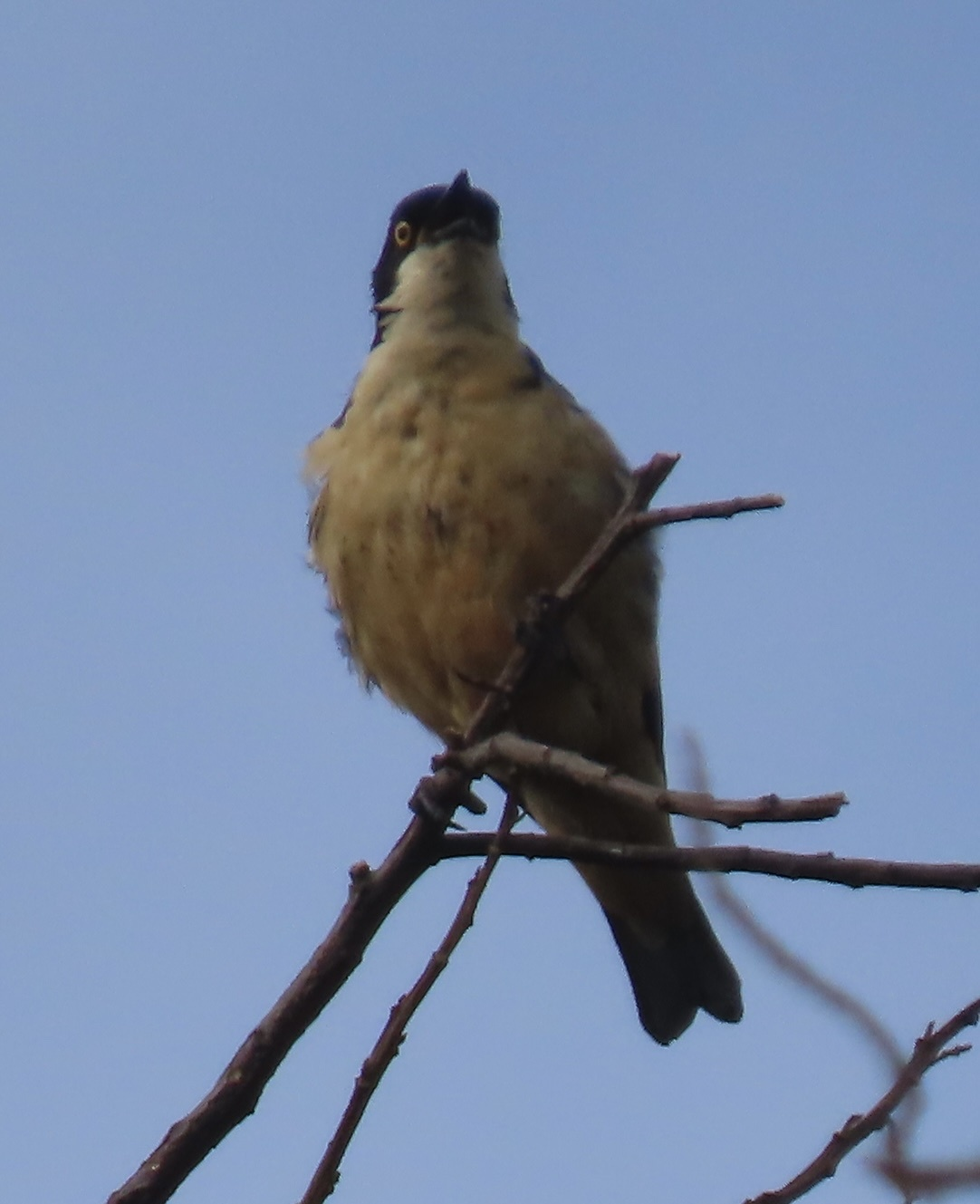

Conservation status
- Least Concern (IUCN 3.1)

Scientific classification
- Kingdom: Animalia
- Phylum: Chordata
- Class: Aves
- Order: Passeriformes
- Family: Sturnidae
- Genus: Pholia; Reichenow, 1900
- Species: P. sharpii

Binomial name
- Pholia sharpii (Jackson, 1898)

Synonyms
- Poeoptera sharpii Cinnyricinclus sharpii

= Sharpe's starling =

Species of bird

Sharpe's starling (Pholia sharpii) is a species of starling in the family Sturnidae. It is found in Burundi, the Democratic Republic of the Congo, Ethiopia, Kenya, Rwanda, South Sudan, Sudan, Tanzania, and Uganda. It is monotypic in the genus Pholia.

The common name and Latin binomial name commemorate the British zoologist Richard Bowdler Sharpe.
