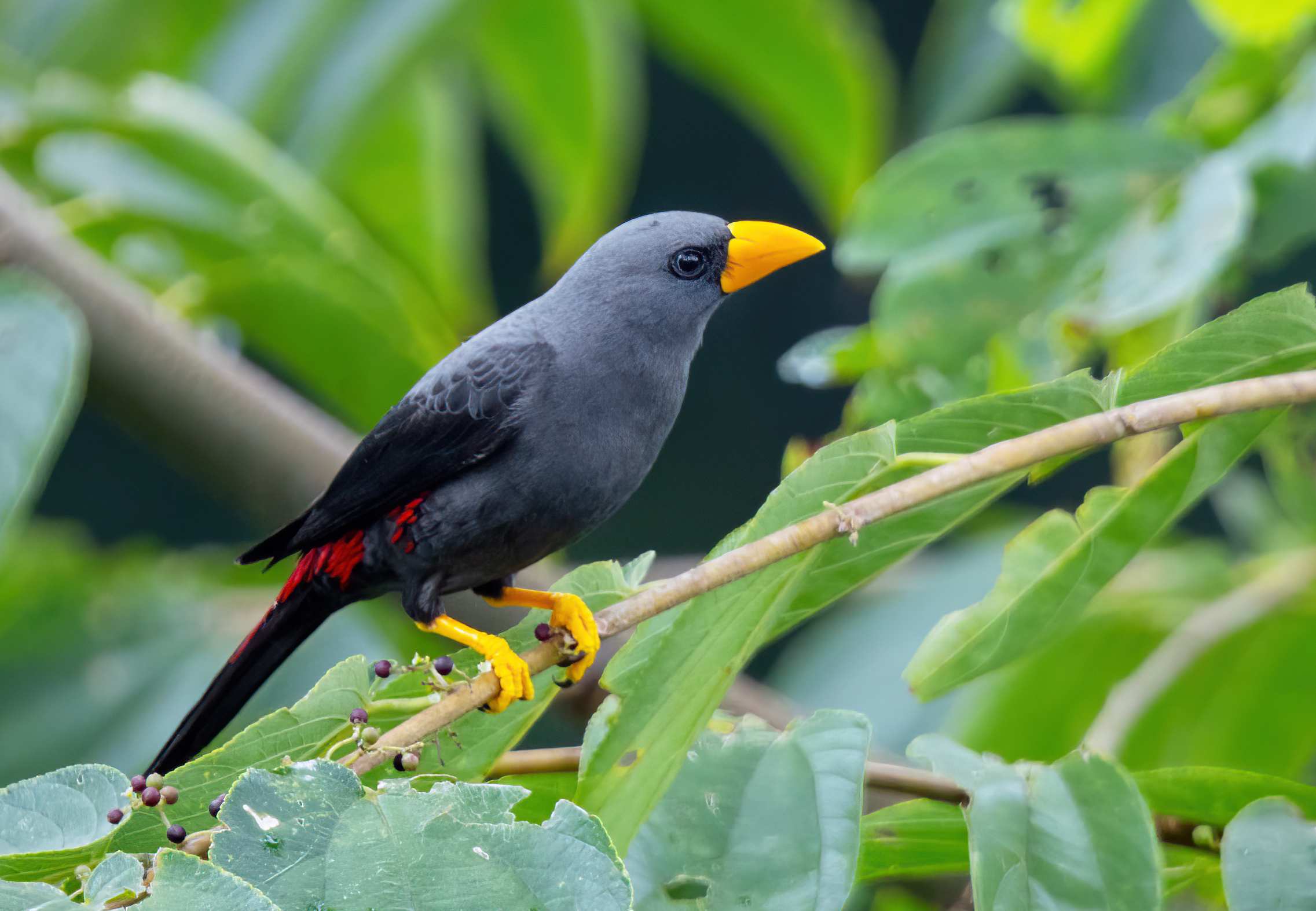
- Grosbeak starling at Pinasungkulan, North Sulawesi, Indonesia

Conservation status
- Least Concern (IUCN 3.1)

Scientific classification
- Kingdom: Animalia
- Phylum: Chordata
- Class: Aves
- Order: Passeriformes
- Family: Sturnidae
- Genus: Scissirostrum; Lafresnaye, 1845
- Species: S. dubium

Binomial name
- Scissirostrum dubium (Latham, 1801)

Synonyms
- Lanius dubium (protonym)

= Grosbeak starling =

Species of bird

The grosbeak starling (Scissirostrum dubium), also known as the grosbeak myna, finch-billed myna, or scissor-billed starling, is a species of starling in the family Sturnidae. It is monotypic in the genus Scissirostrum. It is endemic to Sulawesi, Indonesia, where its natural habitat is tropical lowland, and sometimes subtropical montane, lightly wooded forest areas and wetlands. It is threatened in the wild by habitat loss, and by birds being captured for the cagebird trade.

This species nests in colonies, which frequently contain hundreds of pairs. Its nests are bored in rotting or dying tree trunks in woodpecker style. It eats fruit, insects, and grain. Grosbeak starlings are highly vocal, at their colonies and in feeding flocks.

The grosbeak starling was first described by the English ornithologist John Latham in 1801 under the binomial name Lanius dubium.

New populations, derived from escaped cagebirds, have been found breeding in Kalimantan in Borneo, and in Java.
