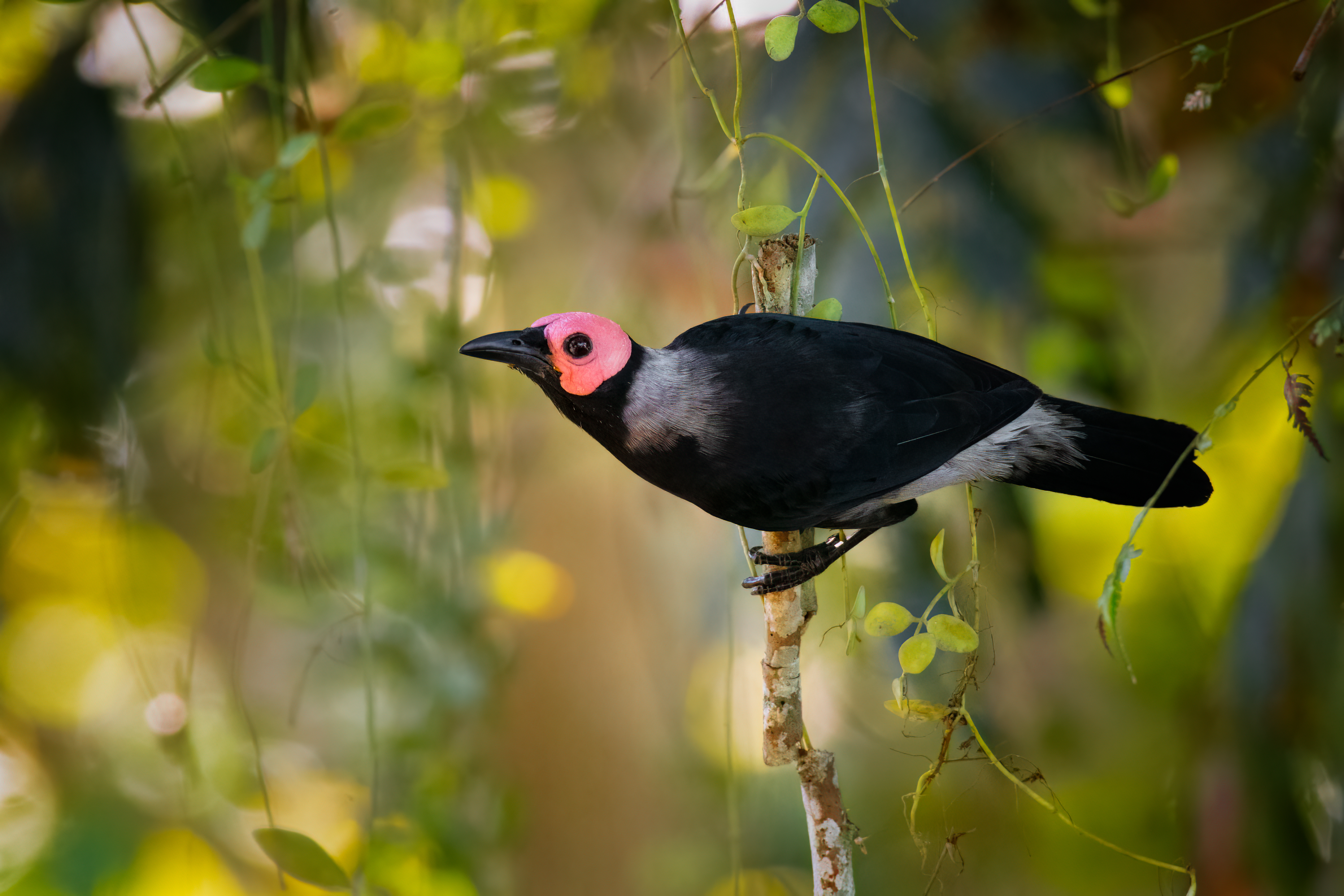

Conservation status
- Least Concern (IUCN 3.1)

Scientific classification
- Kingdom: Animalia
- Phylum: Chordata
- Class: Aves
- Order: Passeriformes
- Family: Sturnidae
- Genus: Sarcops; Walden, 1875
- Species: S. calvus

Binomial name
- Sarcops calvus (Linnaeus, 1766)

Synonyms
- Gracula calva Linnaeus, 1766

= Coleto =

Species of bird

The coleto (Sarcops calvus) is a starling species (family Sturnidae) in the monotypic genus Sarcops. It is endemic to the Philippines. Its natural habitats are tropical dry forest, tropical moist lowland forest, and tropical moist montane forest. In Filipino and Tagalog, this bird is known as kuling or koleto, while in Central Visayas, it is commonly known as the sal-ing.

== Description and taxonomy ==
In 1760 the French zoologist Mathurin Jacques Brisson included a description of the coleto in his Ornithologie based on a specimen collected in the Philippines. He used the French name Le merle chauve des Philippines and the Latin Merula Calva Philippensis. Although Brisson coined Latin names, these do not conform to the binomial system and are not recognised by the International Commission on Zoological Nomenclature. WI 1766, when the Swedish naturalist Carl Linnaeus updated his Systema Naturae for the twelfth edition, he added 240 species that had been previously described by Brisson. One of these was the coleto. Linnaeus included a brief description, coined the binomial name Gracula calva and cited Brisson's work. The specific name is from Latin calvus "bald" or "without hair". This species is now the only member of the genus Sarcops that was introduced by the English ornithologist Arthur Walden in 1875. The name combines the Ancient Greek words sarx, sarkos "flesh" and ōps, ōpos "face" or "complexion".

=== Subspecies ===
Three subspecies are recognised:

- S. c. calvus (Linnaeus, 1766) – north Philippines
- S. c. melanonotus (Ogilvie-Grant, 1906) – central and south Philippines
- S. c. lowii (Sharpe, 1877) – Sulu Archipelago (southwest Philippines)

== Ecology and behavior ==
Feeds on fruit, berries, small insects and nectar. Forages singly, in pairs and occasionally in small groups of up to 25, in fruiting trees. Breeds from March to September. Nests in cavities in dead trees. Clutch size is typically 2 to 3 eggs.

The Coleto was a recently discovered host of the brood parasitic Asian Koel (Eudynamys scolopaceus) in the Philippines.

== Habitat and conservation status ==
This bird's habitat is primary and secondary forest and scrubland up to 1,000 meters above sea level.

IUCN has assessed this bird as least-concern species as it has a large range and is common throughout. However, deforestation in the Philippines continues throughout the country due to slash and burn farming, mining, illegal logging and habitat conversion. It is widely caught for the pet trade as it has the ability to copy human speech.
