= Cornus volkensii =

Conservation status
- Least Concern (IUCN 3.1)

Scientific classification
- Kingdom: Plantae
- Clade: Tracheophytes
- Clade: Angiosperms
- Clade: Eudicots
- Clade: Asterids
- Order: Cornales
- Family: Cornaceae
- Genus: Cornus
- Subgenus: Cornus subg. Afrocrania
- Species: C. volkensii

Binomial name
- Cornus volkensii Harms

Synonyms
- Afrocrania volkensii (Harms) Hutch.

Species of tree

Cornus volkensii is a species of tree in the family Cornaceae native to montane forests of eastern Africa, from South Sudan and Kenya south to Zimbabwe and Mozambique.

== Description ==
Cornus volkensii is a small to medium-sized dioecious evergreen tree.

== Range and habitat ==
Cornus volkensii is found in the mountains of eastern Africa, from South Sudan and Kenya through Uganda, the eastern Democratic Republic of the Congo, Rwanda, Burundi, Tanzania, and Malawi to Mozambique and Zimbabwe.

It is found in humid Afromontane forests, generally between 1,800 and 3,000 meters elevation, and occasionally as low as 1,200 meters elevation. It is often found along streams.
