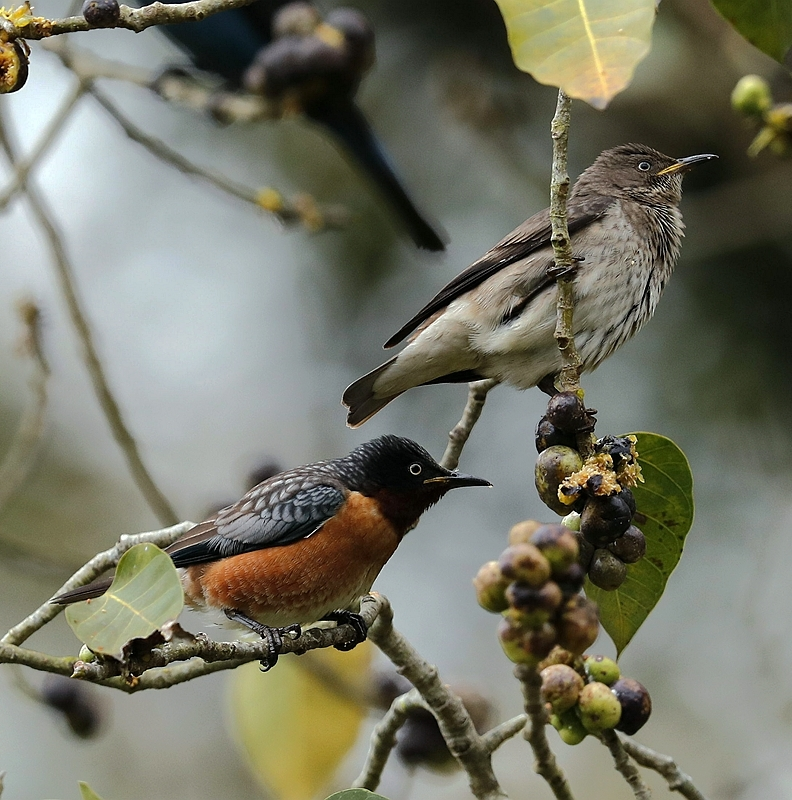
- Male (bottom), female (top). Northern Thailand.

Conservation status
- Least Concern (IUCN 3.1)

Scientific classification
- Kingdom: Animalia
- Phylum: Chordata
- Class: Aves
- Order: Passeriformes
- Family: Sturnidae
- Genus: Saroglossa; Hodgson, 1844
- Species: S. spilopterus

Binomial name
- Saroglossa spilopterus (Vigors, 1831)

Synonyms
- Saroglossa spiloptera

= Spot-winged starling =

Species of bird

The spot-winged starling (Saroglossa spilopterus) is a species of starling in the family Sturnidae. It breeds in northern India and western Nepal; it winters in Northeast India, north-eastern Bangladesh and Myanmar. Its natural habitats are subtropical or tropical moist lowland forest and subtropical or tropical moist montane forest.

It eats insects and fruit. It also feeds on nectar from Erythrina, Bombax, and Grevillea trees.

== Description ==
The spot-winged starling is a small starling with light yellow or whitish eyes. It has an average length of 19 cm (7.5 in) and an average mass of 47.5 g (1.68 oz). Adult males have dark-edged grey feathers on the upperparts and reddish-brown rumps. The underparts are largely chestnut-brown, with pale areas along the breast and belly. The wings are blackish with an olive-green gloss and a white blotch on the primaries. The tail is rufous-brown. The chin and throat are reddish-brown, while the rest of the head is greyish-black. The legs are dark brown and the beaks are black. Females are much more brown, with greyish-brown upperparts. The underparts down to the throat are dark-streaked light brown, while the flanks and belly are whitish. Juveniles are similar to females, but lack the pale eyes of the adults.

== Distribution and habitat ==
Spot-winged starlings are native to the Indian subcontinent, breeding in the foothills of the Himalayas from Himachal Pradesh east through Uttarakhand to Nepal and northern Uttar Pradesh. They are migratory, spending the winter in Northeast India, Bangladesh, Myanmar, and northwestern Thailand. They can be seen as passage migrants in West Bengal and Sikkim.

These starlings prefer open montane forests at elevations of 700–1,000 m (2,300–3,300 ft), although they can be found as high as 2,000 m (6,600 ft) in some locations. During the non-breeding season, they are sometimes seen in lowlands.

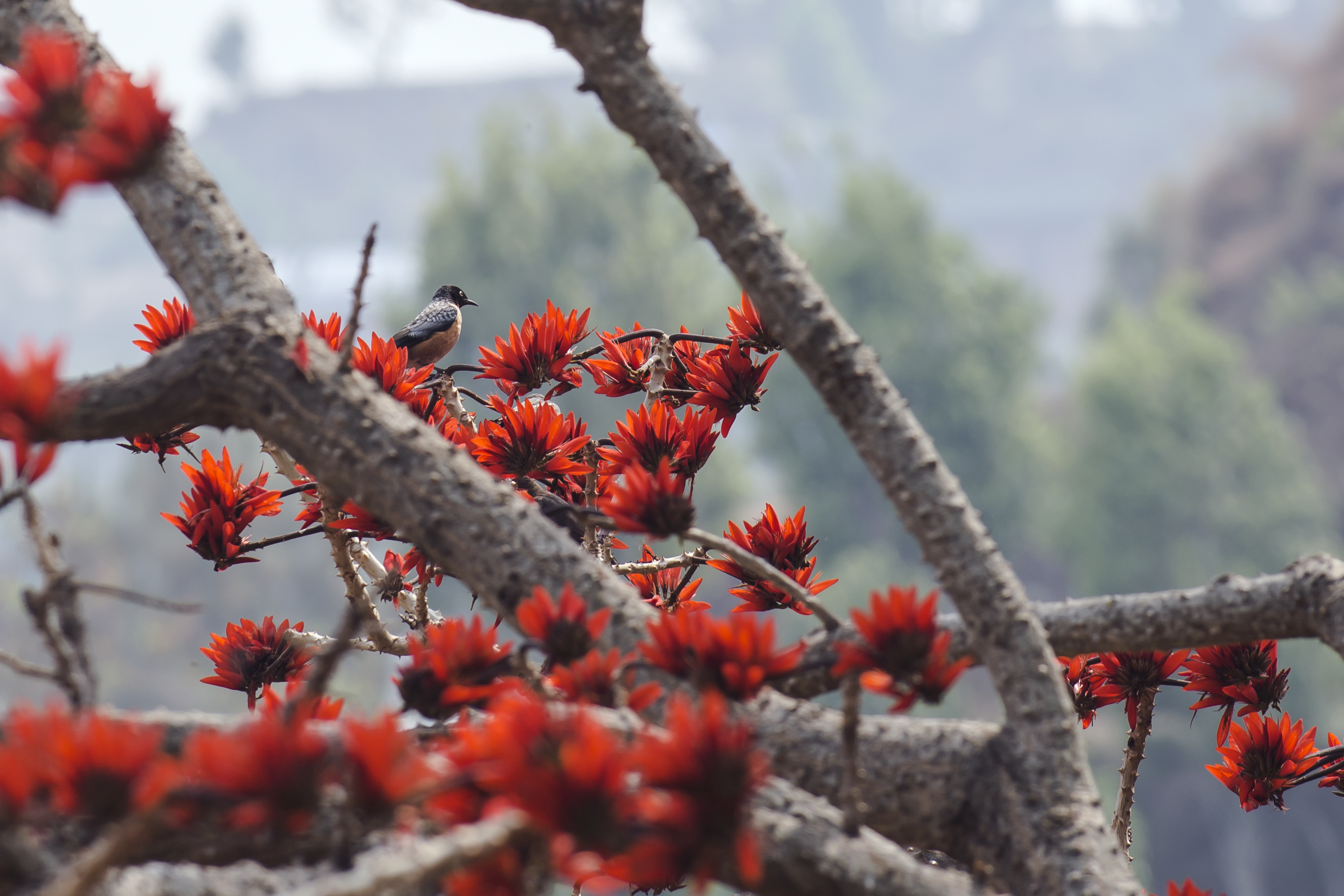
Male on a coral tree (Erythrina sp.)
