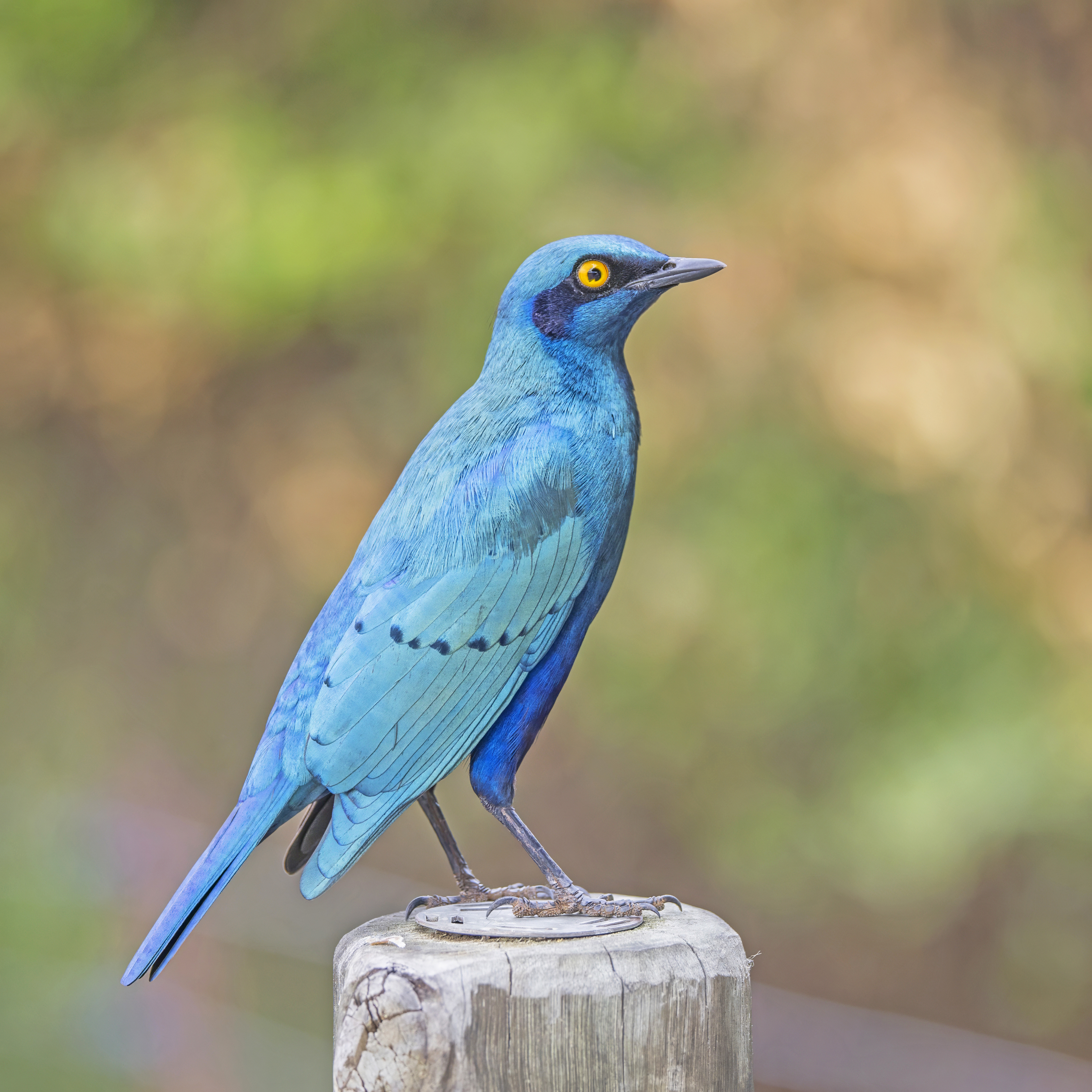
- L. c. nordmanni Kruger National Park, South Africa

Conservation status
- Least Concern (IUCN 3.1)

Scientific classification
- Kingdom: Animalia
- Phylum: Chordata
- Class: Aves
- Order: Passeriformes
- Family: Sturnidae
- Genus: Lamprotornis
- Species: L. chalybaeus

Binomial name
- Lamprotornis chalybaeus Hemprich & Ehrenberg, 1828
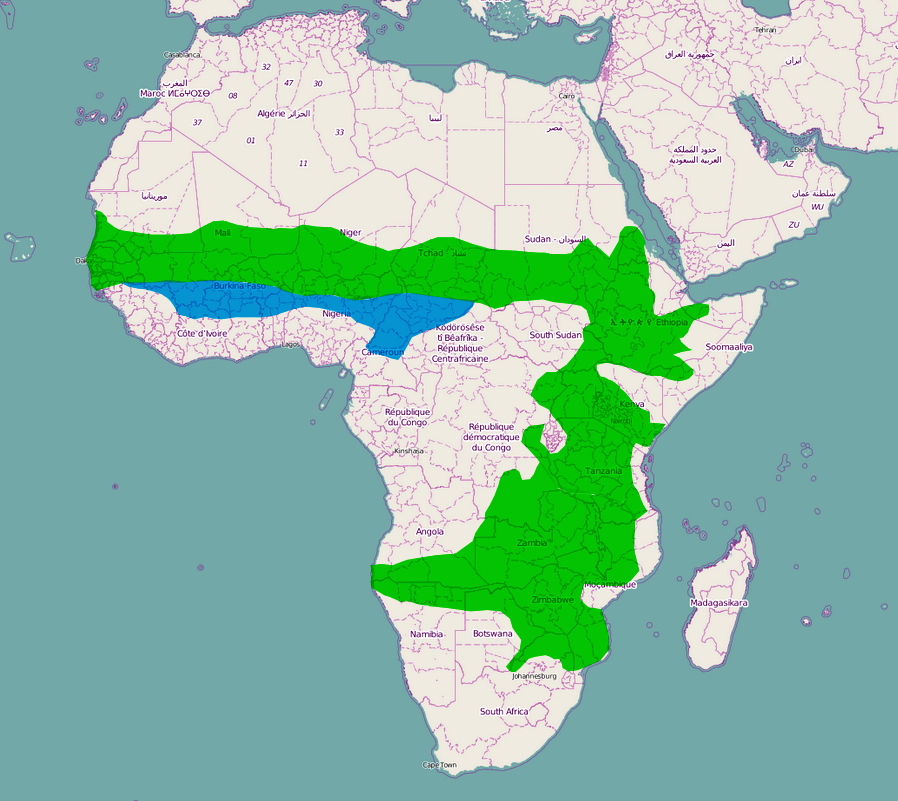
- resident range dry season visitor

= Greater blue-eared starling =

Species of bird

The greater blue-eared starling or greater blue-eared glossy-starling (Lamprotornis chalybaeus) is a bird that breeds from Senegal east to Ethiopia and south through eastern Africa to northeastern South Africa and Angola. It is a very common species of open woodland bird, and undertakes some seasonal migration.

== Subspecies ==
There are four accepted subspecies:

- Lamprotornis chalybaeus chalybaeus — Sahel region
- Lamprotornis chalybaeus cyaniventris — northeastern Africa
- Lamprotornis chalybaeus nordmanni — southern Africa
- Lamprotornis chalybaeus scyobius — central and East Africa

== Description ==
The greater blue-eared starling is a 22 cm long, short tailed bird. This starling is glossy blue-green with a purple-blue belly and blue ear patch. Its iris is bright yellow or orange. The sexes are similar, but the juvenile is duller and has blackish brown underparts.

The populations from southern Kenya southwards are smaller than northern birds and are sometimes considered to be a separate subspecies, L. c. sycobius.

The lesser blue-eared starling is similar to this species, but the blue of the belly does not extend forward of the legs.

The greater blue-eared starling has a range of musical or grating calls, but the most familiar is a nasal squee-ar.

== Behaviour ==
=== Breeding ===
The greater blue-eared starling nests in holes in trees, either natural or excavated by woodpeckers or barbets. It will also nest inside the large stick nests of the sacred ibis or Abdim's stork. A nest will include three to five eggs, which are usually greenish-blue with brown or purple spots, and hatch in 13–14 days. The chicks leave the nest roughly 23 days after hatching.

This species is parasitised by the great spotted cuckoo and occasionally by the greater honeyguide.

=== Roosting ===
The greater blue-eared starling is highly gregarious and will form large flocks, often with other starlings. Its roosts, in reedbed, thorn bushes, or acacia, may also be shared.

=== Feeding ===
Like other starlings, the greater blue-eared starling is an omnivore, taking a wide range of invertebrates, seeds, and berries, especially figs, but is diet is mainly insects taken from the ground.

It will perch on livestock, feeding on insects disturbing the animals and occasionally removing ectoparasites.
