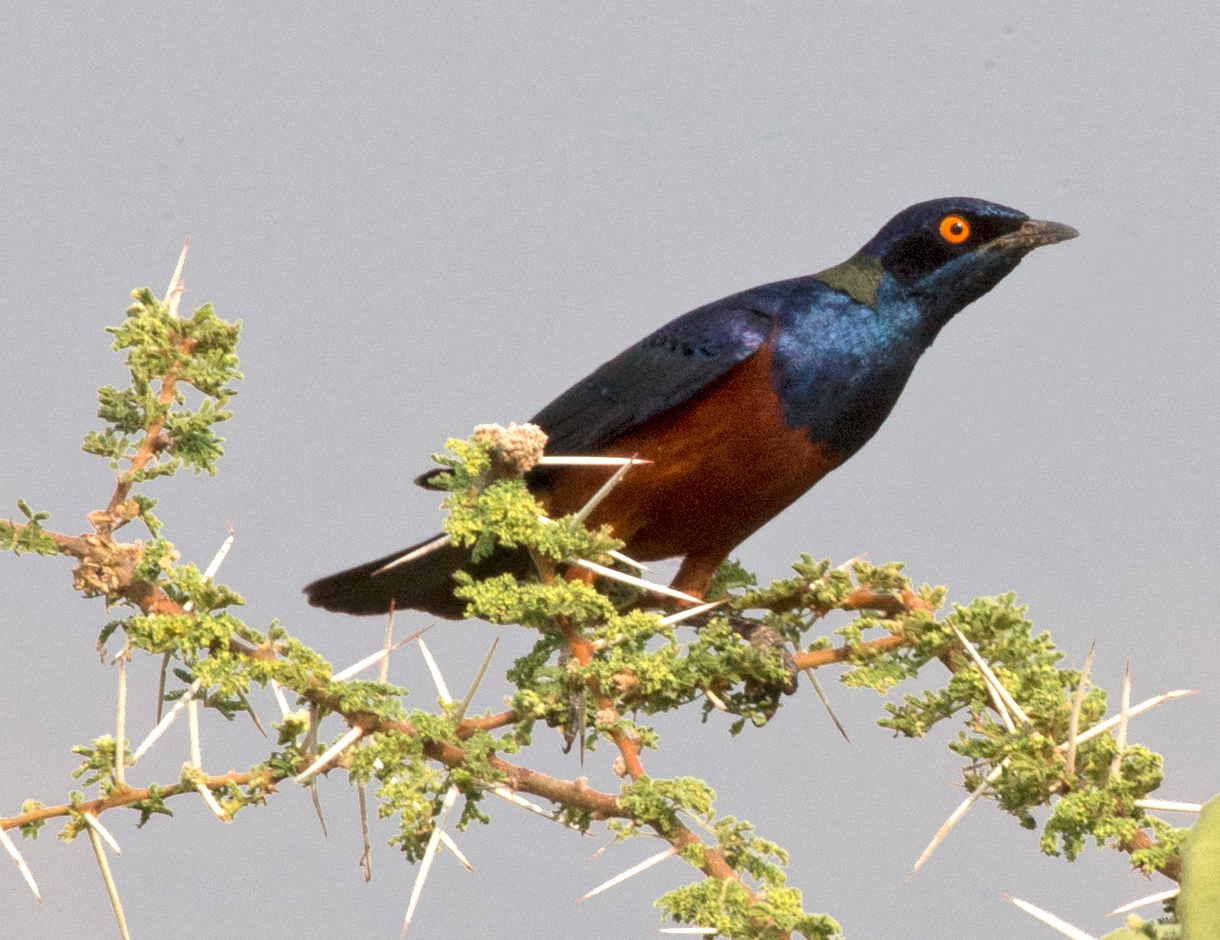

Conservation status
- Least Concern (IUCN 3.1)

Scientific classification
- Kingdom: Animalia
- Phylum: Chordata
- Class: Aves
- Order: Passeriformes
- Family: Sturnidae
- Genus: Lamprotornis
- Species: L. shelleyi

Binomial name
- Lamprotornis shelleyi (Sharpe, 1890)

= Shelley's starling =

Species of bird

Shelley's starling (Lamprotornis shelleyi) is a species of starling in the family Sturnidae. It is found in East Africa, within the borders of Ethiopia, Kenya, Somalia, Somaliland, South Sudan, and Tanzania.

The common name and Latin binomial commemorate George Ernest Shelley, an English ornithologist and nephew of poet Percy Bysshe Shelley.
