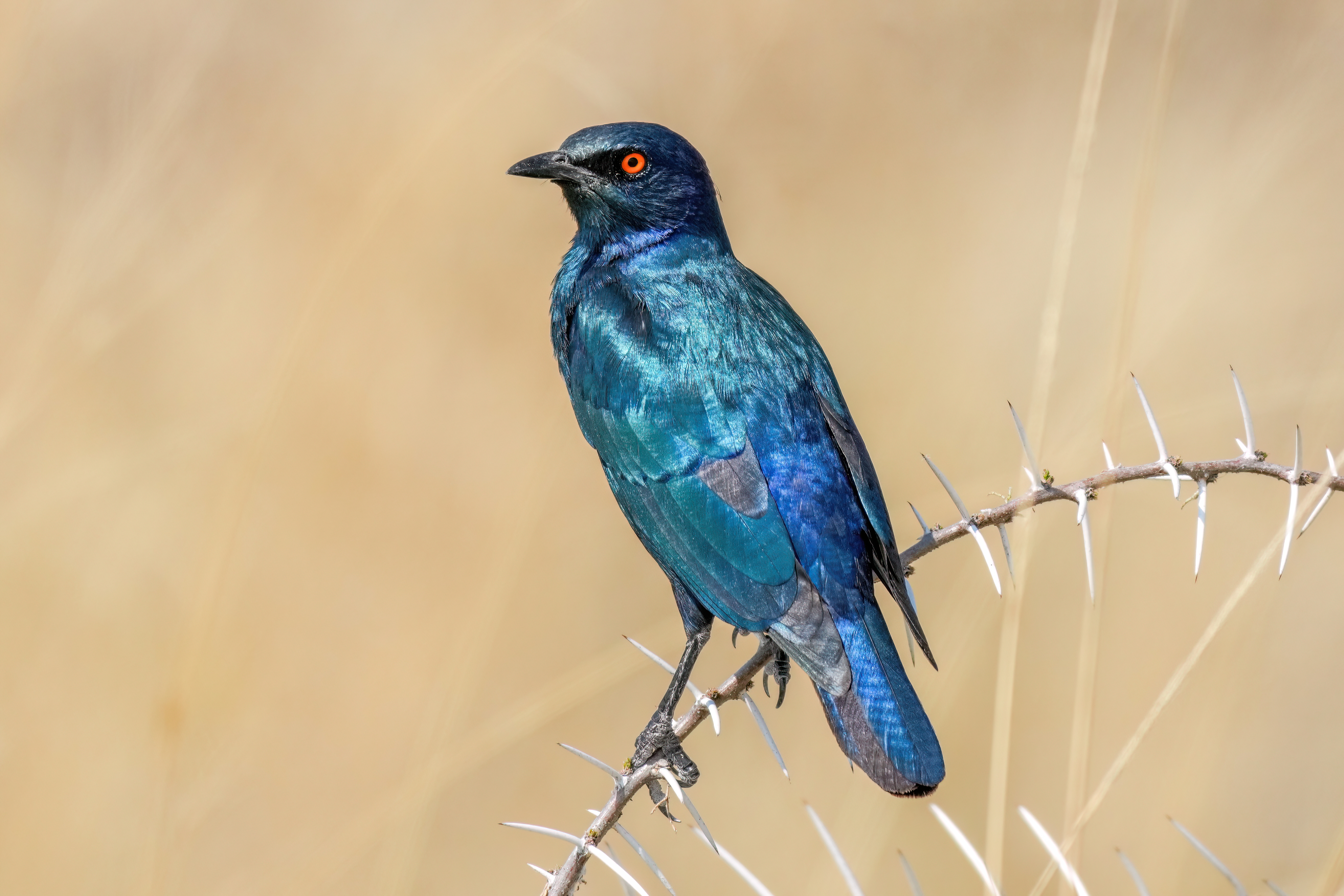
- Cape starling in Etosha National Park, Namibia

Conservation status
- Least Concern (IUCN 3.1)

Scientific classification
- Kingdom: Animalia
- Phylum: Chordata
- Class: Aves
- Order: Passeriformes
- Family: Sturnidae
- Genus: Lamprotornis
- Species: L. nitens

Binomial name
- Lamprotornis nitens (Linnaeus, 1766)
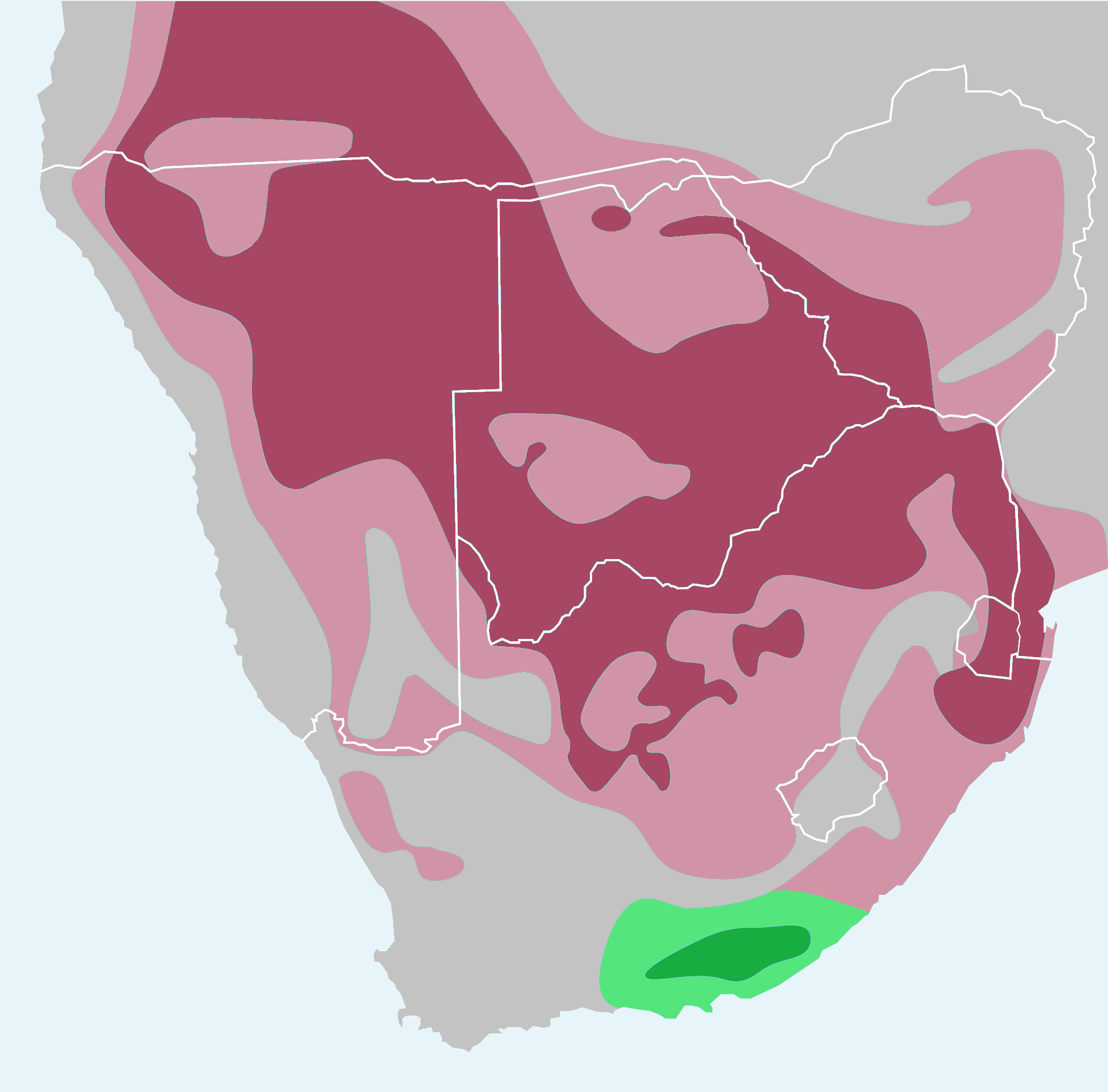
- L. n. phoenicopterus L. n. culminator
- Cape starling (Lamprotornis nitens) IUCN range (2018)

Synonyms
- Turdus nitens Linnaeus, 1766

= Cape starling =

Species of bird

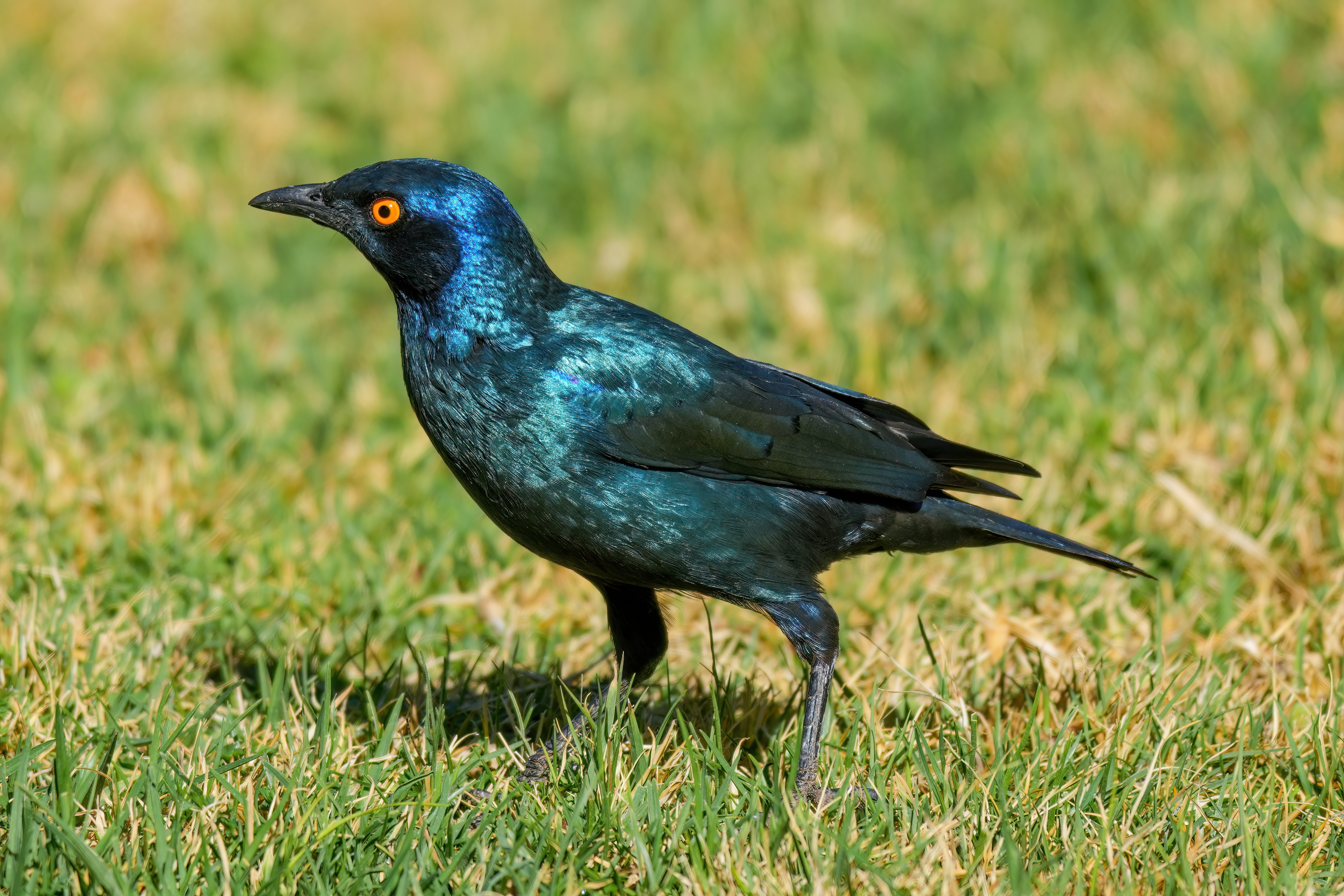
Cape Starling in Namibia

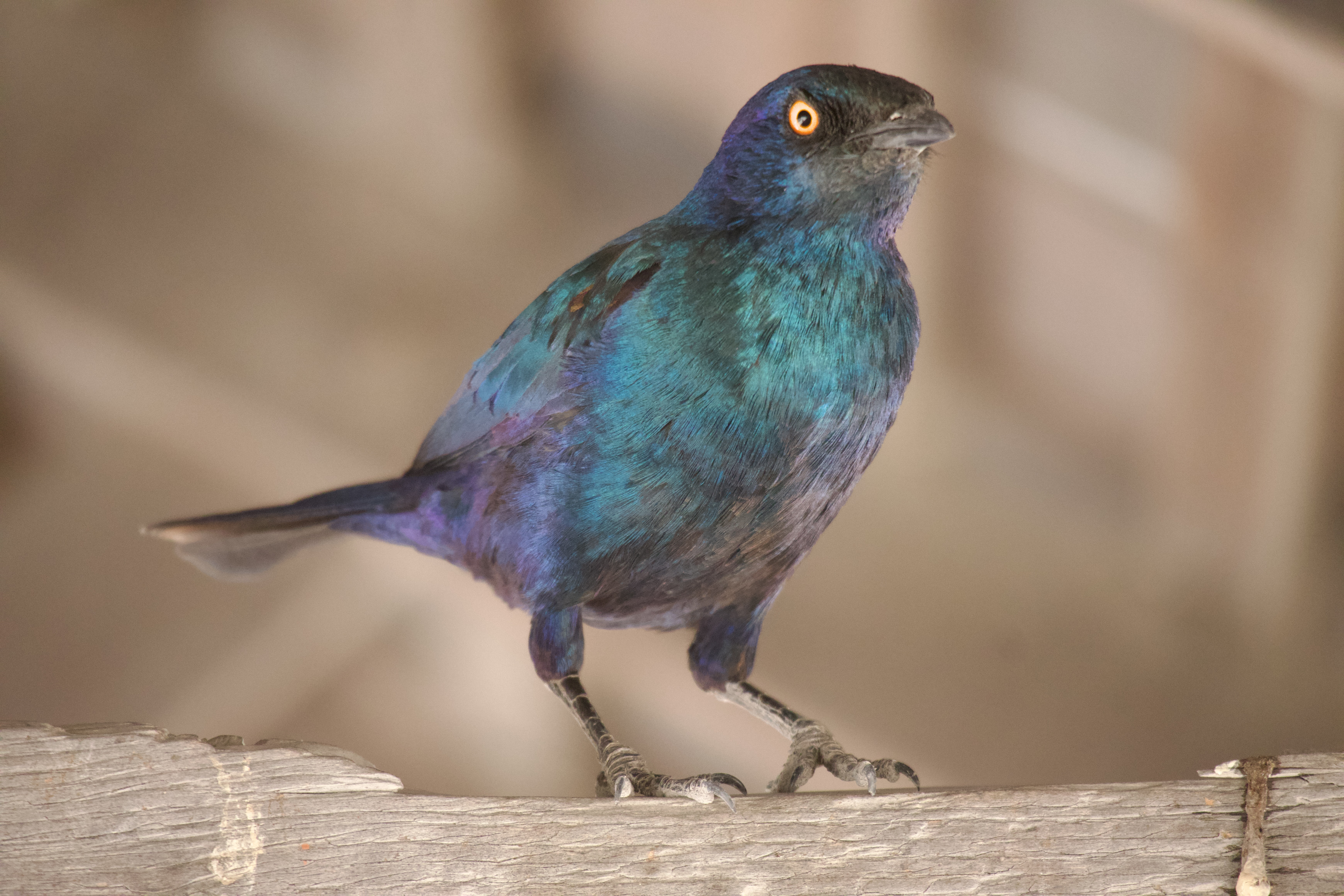
Cape starling in Namibia

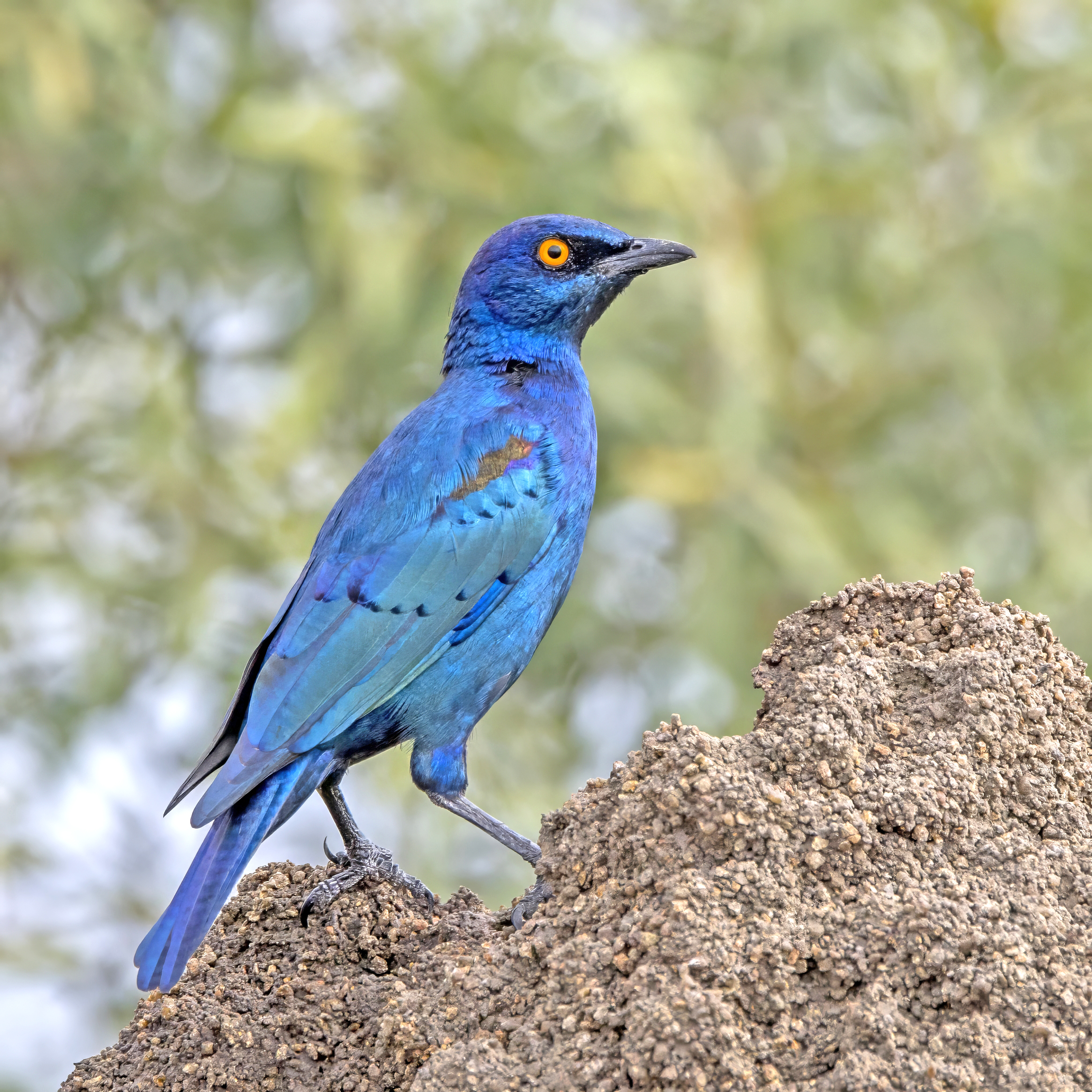
L. nitens phoenicopterus in the Kruger National Park, South Africa

The Cape starling (Lamprotornis nitens), also known as red-shouldered glossy-starling or Cape glossy starling, is a species of starling in the family Sturnidae. It is found in Southern Africa, where it lives in woodlands, bushveld and in suburbs.

== Subspecies ==
Two subspecies are recognised, but not by all authors. L. n. culminator is said to be larger, with greener wing and tail plumage. Its secondary remiges are also glossy on both vanes, i.e. not matt black on the inner vanes as in L. n. phoenicopterus.

- L. n. phoenicopterus — widespread in Southern Africa
- L. n. culminator — Eastern Cape, South Africa

== Taxonomy ==
In 1760, the French zoologist Mathurin Jacques Brisson included a description of the Cape starling in his Ornithologie based on a specimen collected in Angola. He used the French name Le merle verd d'Angola and the Latin Merula Viridis Angolensis. Although Brisson coined Latin names, these do not conform to the binomial system and are not recognised by the International Commission on Zoological Nomenclature. When in 1766, the Swedish naturalist Carl Linnaeus updated his Systema Naturae for the twelfth edition, he added 240 species that had been previously described by Brisson. One of these was the Cape starling. Linnaeus included a brief description, coined the binomial name Turdus nitens and cited Brisson's work. The specific name nitens is Latin for "shining" or "glittering". This species is now placed in the genus Lamprotornis that was introduced by the Dutch zoologist Coenraad Jacob Temminck in 1820.

== Description ==
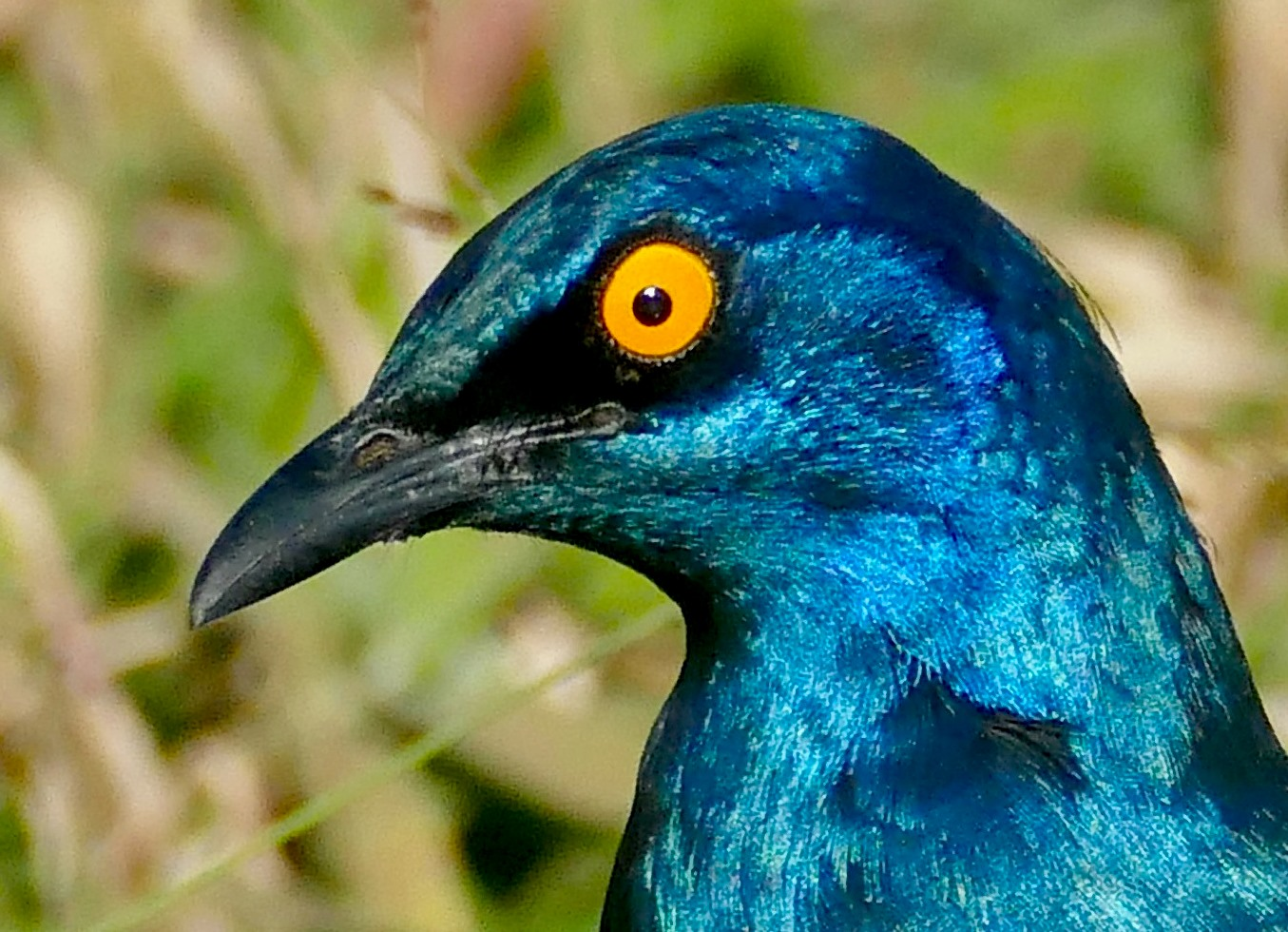
Cape starling in the Kruger National Park, South Africa — neither its ear coverts or flank feathers contrast strongly with the remainder of the plumage, cf. blue-eared starlings.

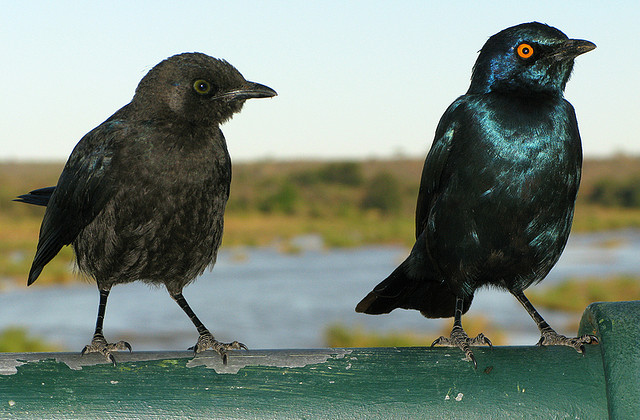
A juvenile (at left with matt plumage) and an adult Cape starling. The adult has yet to complete its post-breeding molt. Eyes of juveniles start changing from grey to yellow at two months. By six months they have the appearance of adults.

The Cape starling has an adult length of about 25 cm (10 in) and weight of about 100 grams (3.5 oz). The plumage of an adult bird is a fairly uniform bright, glossy colour. The head is blue with darker ear coverts and the upper parts of the body are greenish-blue. It has a lengthy warbling song which may include an imitation of sounds it hears in its environment.

== Distribution and habitat ==
The Cape starling is found in the southern part of Africa. Its range encompasses the extreme south of Gabon, the west and south of Angola, the extreme south of Zambia, throughout Zimbabwe, Namibia, Botswana, Lesotho and South Africa. It is a vagrant to the Republic of the Congo but does not breed there. In the other countries in its range it is a resident (non-migratory) species and its total extent of occurrence is about 3,000,000 square kilometres (1,200,000 sq mi). The Cape starling is found where trees in which it can roost and nest are found. It is not a bird of dense forest or of pasture and is not associated with any particular plant type. It does occur in open woodland, plantations, savannah, bushveld, rough grassland, parks and gardens and is quite numerous in the central Kalahari where isolated trees occur.

== Behaviour ==
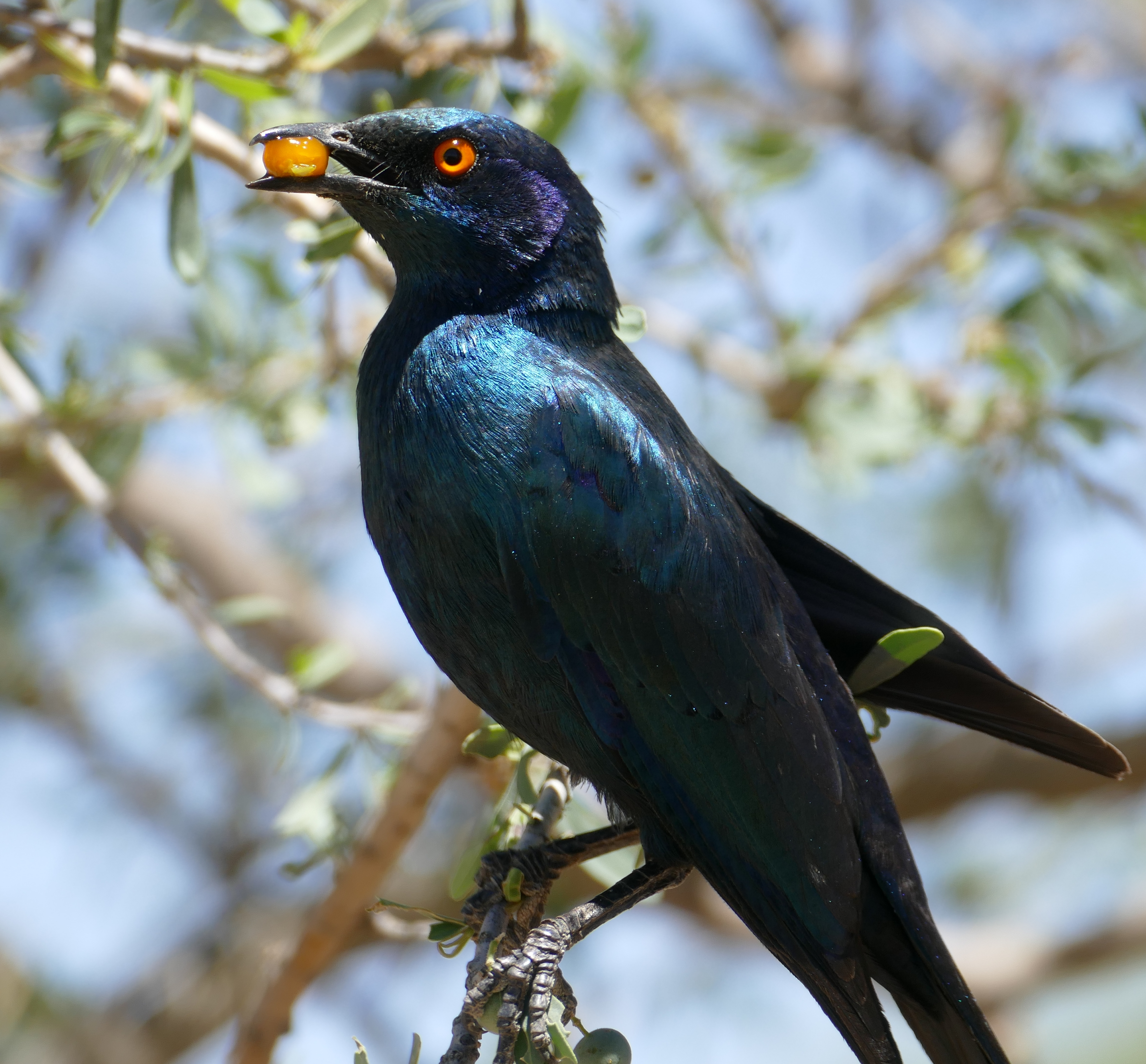
Consuming ripe fruit of a shepherd's tree during early summer, Kgalagadi

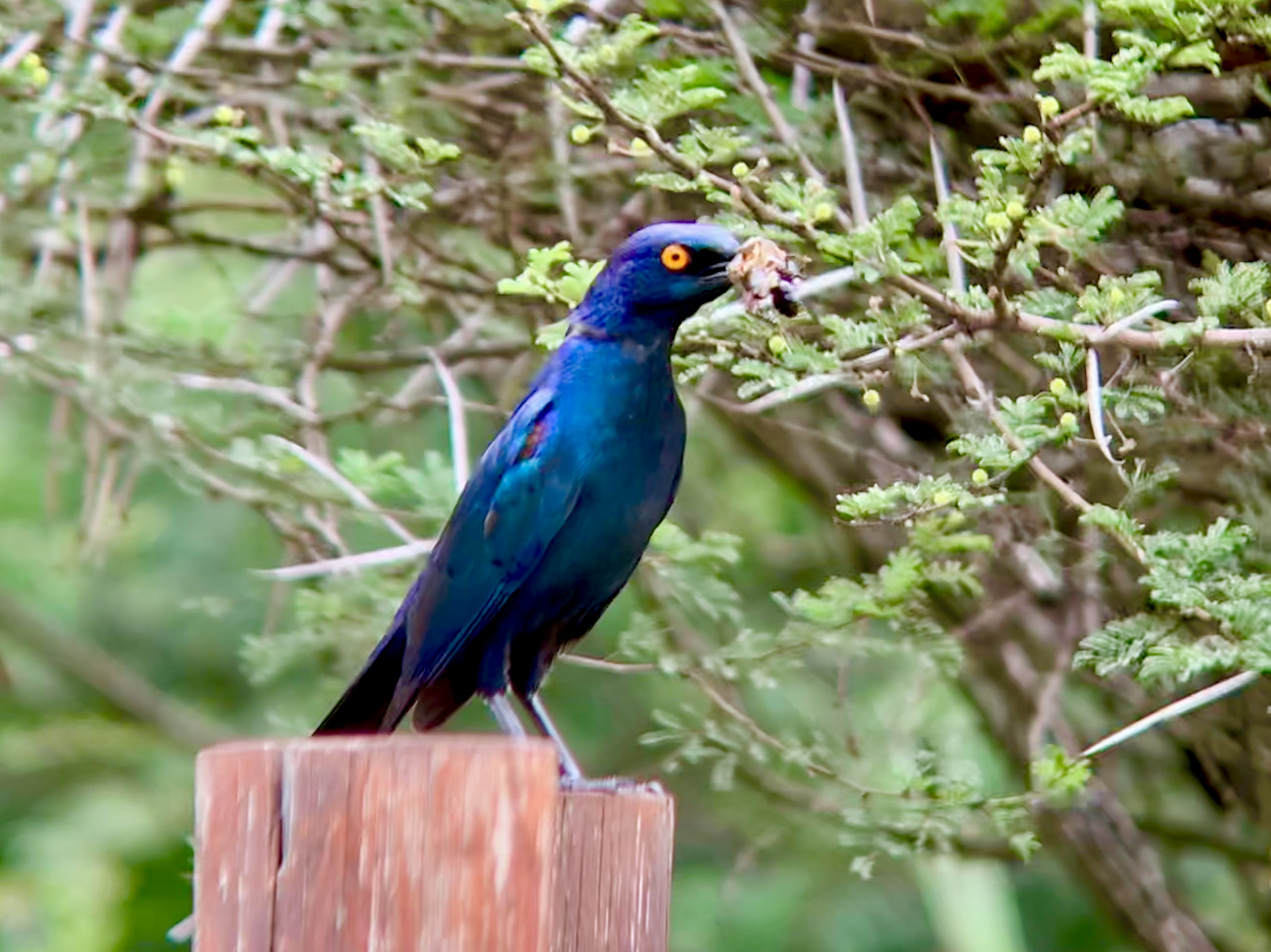
Eating a cricket in the Kube Yini Game Reserve, South Africa

The Cape starling is a gregarious bird and forms large flocks in the non-breeding season. It usually feeds on the ground often foraging alongside other species of starlings such as the pied starling, the common starling, the greater blue-eared starling, the lesser blue-eared starling, the wattled starling and Burchell's starling. It is habituated to humans and its diet includes fruit, insects and nectar. It sometimes feeds on ectoparasites that it picks off the backs of animals and it sometimes visits bird tables for scraps.

== Breeding ==
Breeding mainly takes place between October and February but may continue into April in Namibia. It nests in crevices such as holes in trees and out-competes other birds seeking to use these holes. It is a host to the greater honeyguide, a brood parasite that lays its eggs in other birds' nests. In an observed nest in a thorn tree at the edge of the Kalahari, the chicks were fed predominantly on grasshoppers, locusts, ants and beetles, and were also given fruit, insect larvae and other small invertebrates.
