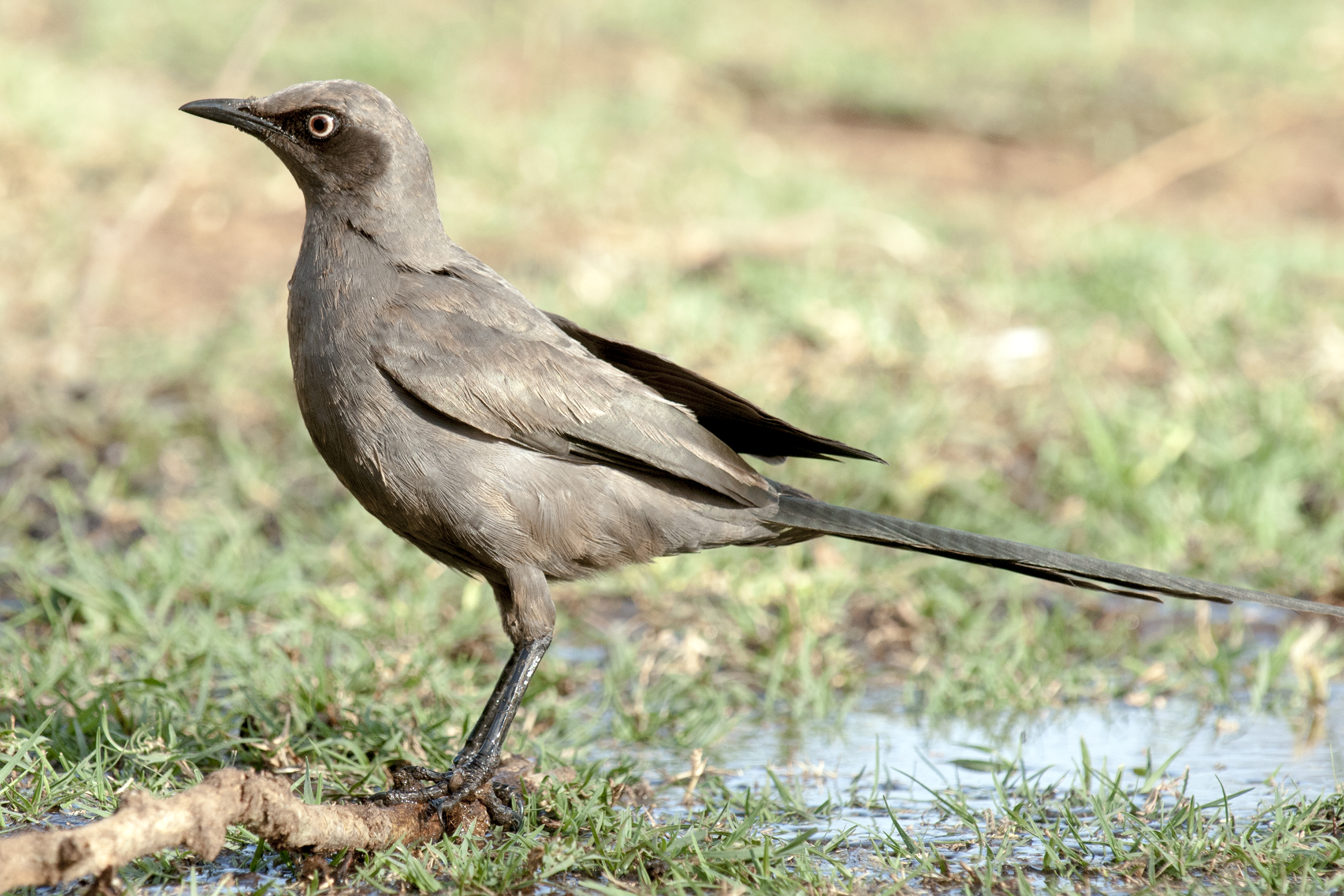
- in the Serengeti National Park

Conservation status
- Least Concern (IUCN 3.1)

Scientific classification
- Kingdom: Animalia
- Phylum: Chordata
- Class: Aves
- Order: Passeriformes
- Family: Sturnidae
- Genus: Lamprotornis
- Species: L. unicolor

Binomial name
- Lamprotornis unicolor (Shelley, 1881)

Synonyms
- Cosmopsarus unicolor Spreo unicolor

= Ashy starling =

Species of bird

The ashy starling (Lamprotornis unicolor) is a species of starling in the family Sturnidae. It is found in Kenya and Tanzania. It is alternatively placed in the genus Cosmopsarus or Spreo.
