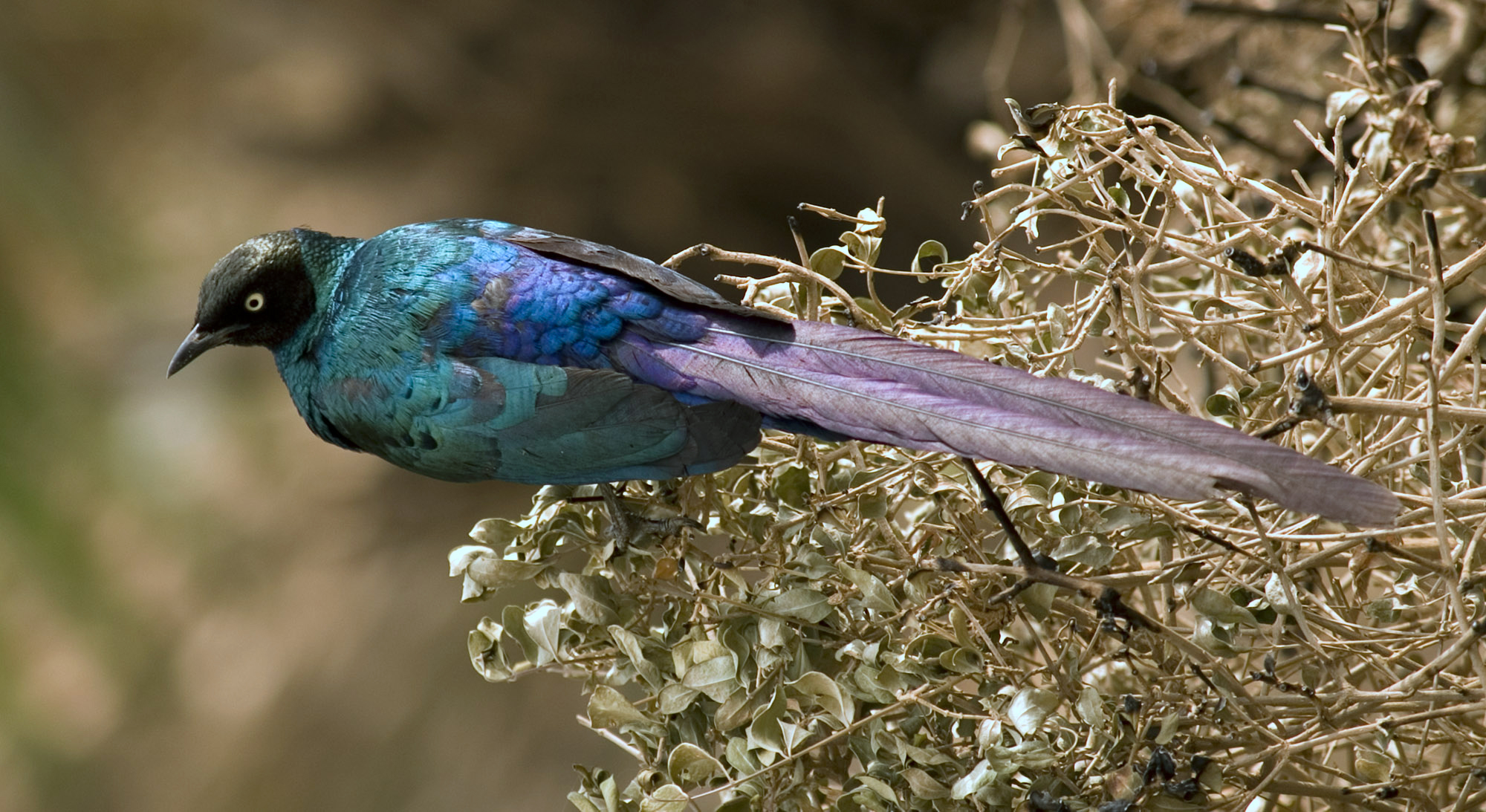
- Parc Forestier de Hann, Senegal

Conservation status
- Least Concern (IUCN 3.1)

Scientific classification
- Kingdom: Animalia
- Phylum: Chordata
- Class: Aves
- Order: Passeriformes
- Family: Sturnidae
- Genus: Lamprotornis
- Species: L. caudatus

Binomial name
- Lamprotornis caudatus (Statius Muller, 1776)

= Long-tailed glossy starling =

Species of bird

The long-tailed glossy starling (Lamprotornis caudatus) is a member of the starling family of birds. It is a resident breeder in tropical Africa from Senegal east to Sudan.

This common passerine is typically found in open woodland and cultivation. The long-tailed glossy starling builds a nest in a hole. The normal clutch is two to four eggs.

This ubiquitous bird is gregarious and noisy, with a harsh grating call.

The adults of these 54 cm (21 in) long birds have metallic green upperparts, violet underparts and a 34 cm (13 in) long purple tail. The face is black with a yellow eye. The sexes are similar, but juveniles are duller, with a brownish tone to the plumage.

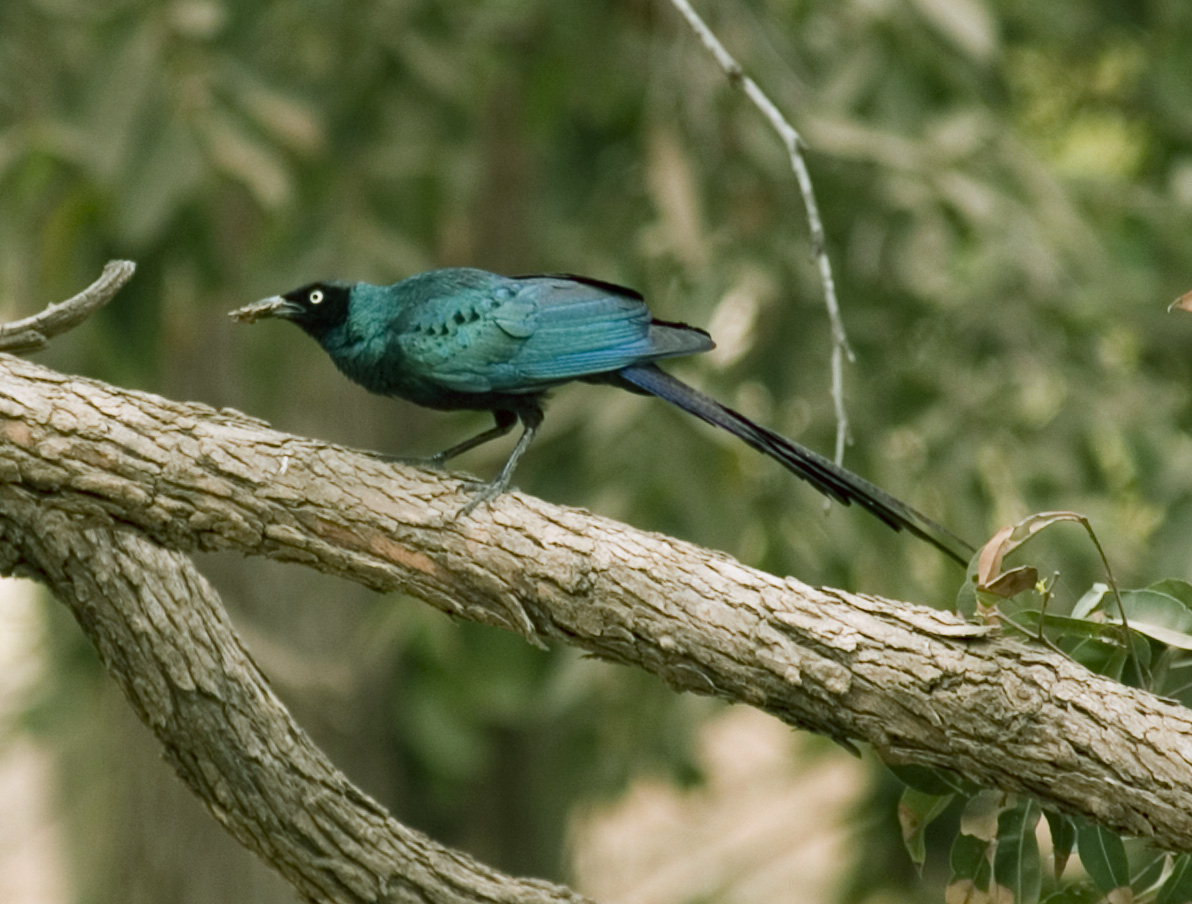
Long-tailed glossy starling

Like most starlings, the long-tailed glossy starling is an omnivore, eating fruit and insects.

== Bibliography ==
- Barlow, Clive; Wacher, Tim (1997). Birds of The Gambia and Senegal. Illustrated by Tony Disley. Pica. ISBN 978-1-873403-32-7.
