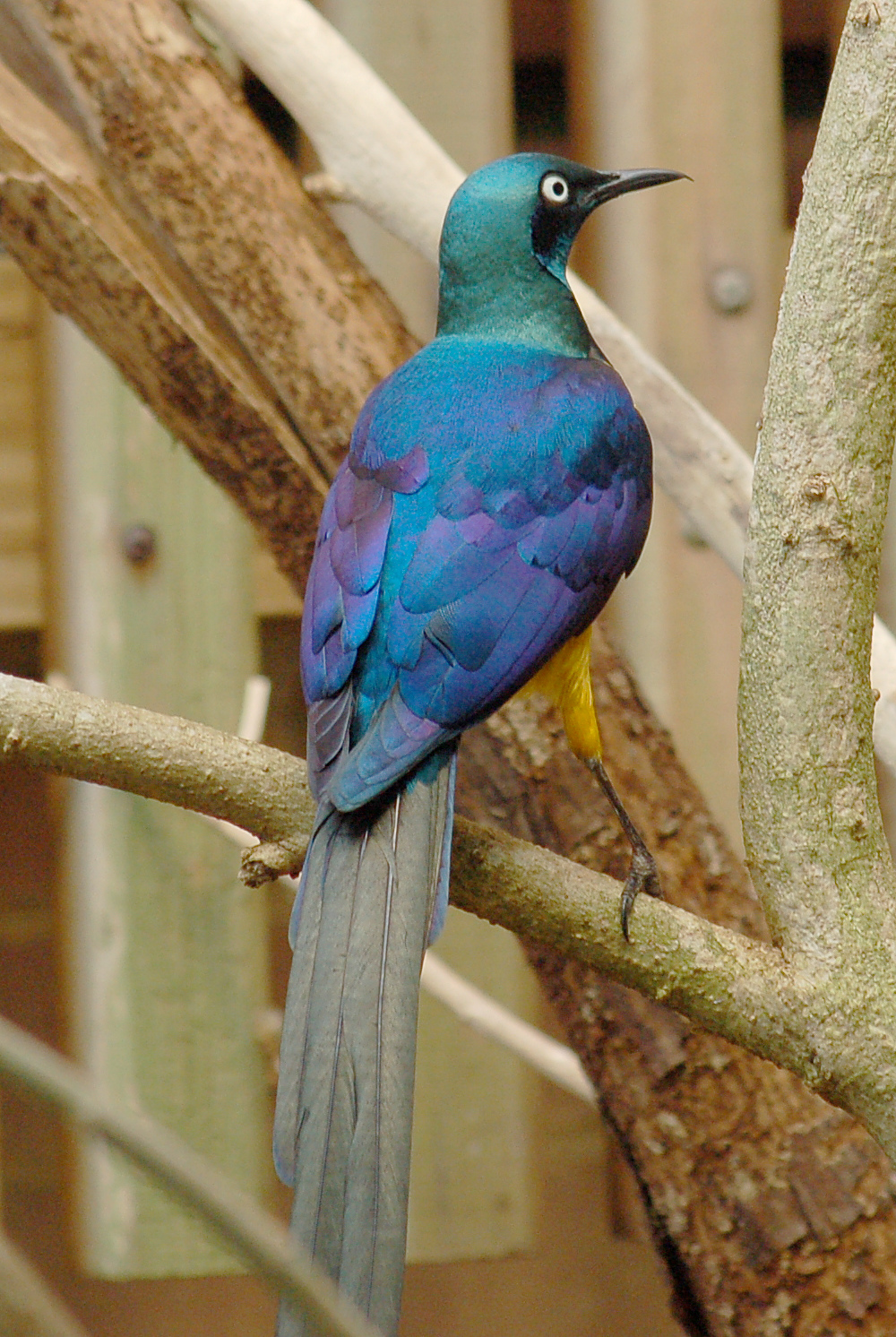
- At National Aviary, Pittsburgh

Conservation status
- Least Concern (IUCN 3.1)

Scientific classification
- Kingdom: Animalia
- Phylum: Chordata
- Class: Aves
- Order: Passeriformes
- Family: Sturnidae
- Genus: Lamprotornis
- Species: L. regius

Binomial name
- Lamprotornis regius (Reichenow, 1879)

Synonyms
- Cosmopsarus regius Reichenow, 1879.

= Golden-breasted starling =

Species of bird

The golden-breasted starling (Lamprotornis regius), also known as royal starling, is a medium-sized passerine in the starling family.

== Subspecies ==
- Lamprotornis regius magnificus (van Someren, 1924)
- Lamprotornis regius regius (Reichenow, 1879)

== Distribution and habitat ==
The golden-breasted starling has a very large range. It is distributed in Northeastern Africa, from Somalia, Ethiopia, Kenya and northern Tanzania. These birds inhabit the grassland, savannah, the thickets of acacias, dry-thorn forests and shrubland.

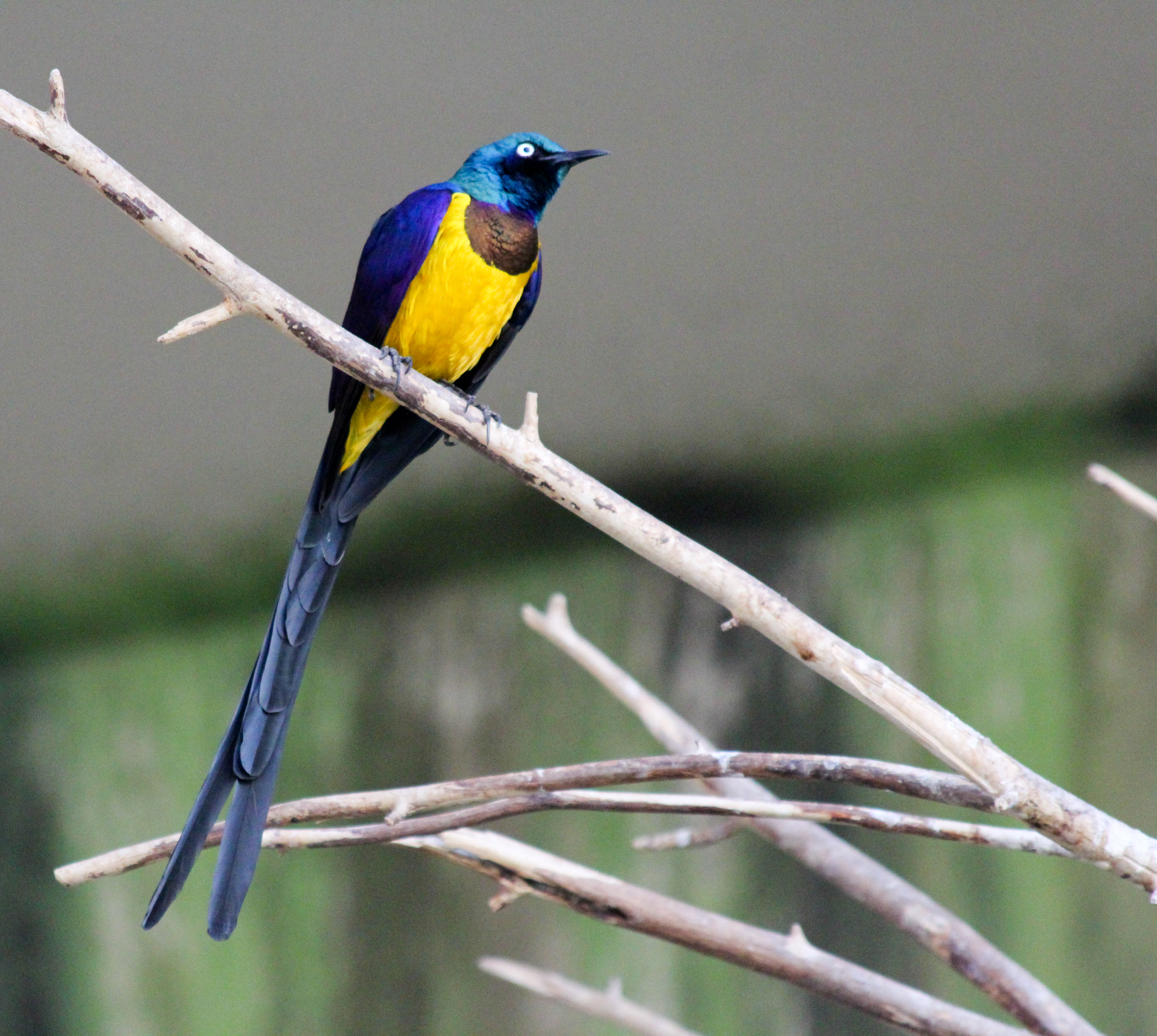
At Bird Kingdom, Niagara Falls, Canada

== Status and conservation ==
Widespread throughout its habitat range, the population trend of the golden-breasted starling appears to be stable. The species is evaluated as being of least concern on the IUCN Red List of Threatened Species.

== Description ==
Lamprotornis regius can reach a body length of about 35 cm (14 in). The adult has a metallic green head and upper back, bright golden yellow breast and belly, dark bill and legs, white iris and metallic violet blue on wings, back, neck and its long tail feathers. Both sexes are similar. The young are duller than the adult.

== Behaviour ==
Video clip

The golden-breasted starling is a social animal, living in groups of three to twelve individuals. Adults can be found from January to June and from August to November, with a peak in January.

=== Breeding ===
The golden-breasted starling molts once a year, after the breeding season. These birds are monogamous. The female usually lays between three and five pale green eggs with red speckles. It nests in tree holes, usually in tree holes that woodpeckers have left. The nest is made from leaves, roots and other vegetation. Entire family groups cooperate in raising young by gathering food and nesting materials.

=== Feeding ===
In contrast to other brilliant starlings, which feed mainly on fruits, their diet consists mainly of insects and termites. Adult birds catch insects in flight and dig up termite mounds to find prey. Snails, spiders, crustaceans, or small vertebrates, such as lizards, sometimes integrates the diet.

== Bibliography ==
- Bryan Richard: Vögel. Parragon, Bath, ISBN 1-4054-5506-3
- Colin Harrison & Alan Greensmith: Vögel. Dorling Kindersly Limited, London 1993, 2000, ISBN 3-8310-0785-3
- del Hoyo, J., Collar, N.J., Christie, D.A., Elliott, A., Fishpool, L.D.C., Boesman, P. and Kirwan, G.M. 2016. HBW and BirdLife International Illustrated Checklist of the Birds of the World. Volume 2: Passerines. Lynx Edicions and BirdLife International, Barcelona, Spain and Cambridge, UK.
- Dowsett, R. J.; Forbes-Watson, A. D. 1993. Checklist of birds of the Afrotropical and Malagasy regions. Tauraco Press, Li
- Gill F. and Donsker D. (eds), Family Sturnidae, in IOC World Bird Names (ver 8.2), International Ornithologists' Union, 2018
- Sibley, C. G.; Monroe, B. L. 1990. Distribution and taxonomy of birds of the world. Yale University Press, New Haven, USA.
