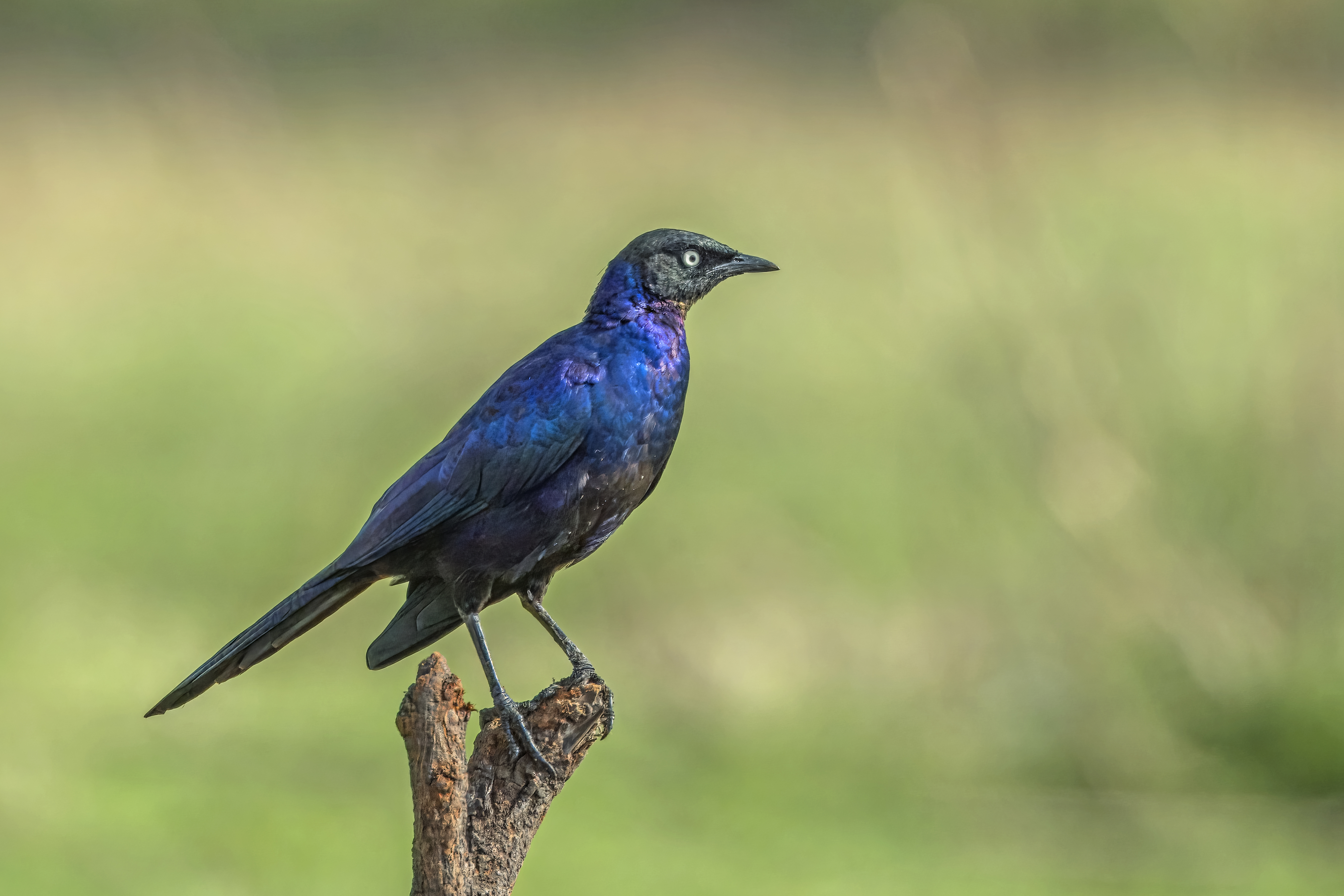
- In Serengeti National Park, Tanzania

Conservation status
- Least Concern (IUCN 3.1)

Scientific classification
- Kingdom: Animalia
- Phylum: Chordata
- Class: Aves
- Order: Passeriformes
- Family: Sturnidae
- Genus: Lamprotornis
- Species: L. purpuroptera

Binomial name
- Lamprotornis purpuroptera Rüppell, 1845

= Rüppell's starling =

Species of bird

Rüppell's starling (Lamprotornis purpuroptera), also known as Rueppell's glossy-starling or Rueppell's long-tailed starling, is a species of starling in the family Sturnidae. It is found in the African countries of Burundi, Chad, the Democratic Republic of the Congo, Eritrea, Ethiopia, Kenya, Rwanda, Somalia, South Sudan, Sudan, Tanzania, and Uganda.
