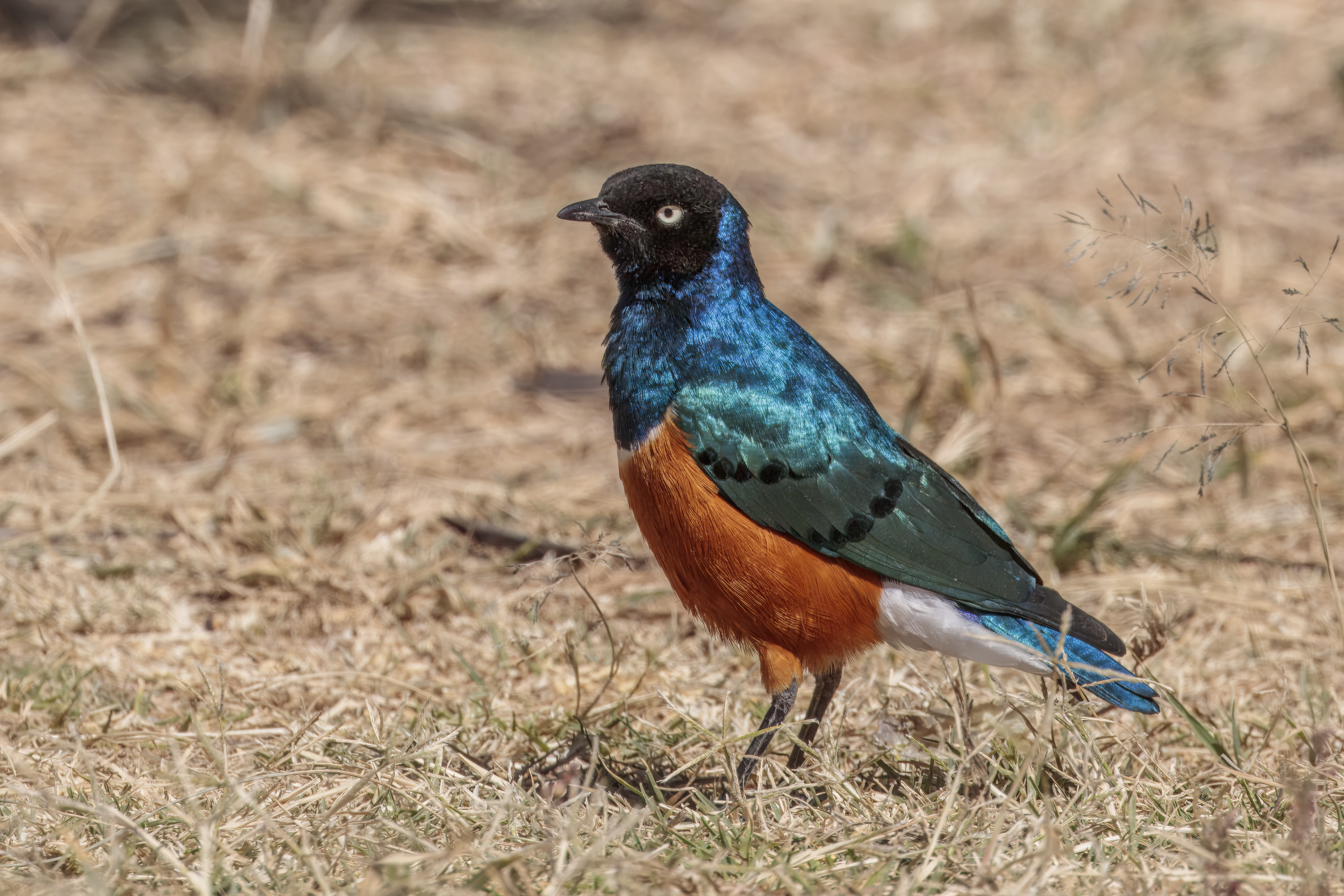
- in Ethiopia

Conservation status
- Least Concern (IUCN 3.1)

Scientific classification
- Kingdom: Animalia
- Phylum: Chordata
- Class: Aves
- Order: Passeriformes
- Family: Sturnidae
- Genus: Lamprotornis
- Species: L. superbus

Binomial name
- Lamprotornis superbus Rüppell, 1845

Synonyms
- Lamprocolius superbus Rüppell, WPES, 1845; Spreo superbus Rüppell, WPES, 1845; Lamprospreo superbus; Lamprotornis superbus superbus Rüppell, WPES, 1845

= Superb starling =

Species of bird

The superb starling (Lamprotornis superbus) is a member of the starling family of birds.

== Distribution ==
This species has a very large range and can commonly be found in East Africa, including Ethiopia, Somalia, Uganda, Kenya, Sudan, and Tanzania.

== Habitat ==
The superb starling lives in savanna, in thornbush and acacia arid areas, open woodland, lakeshore woodlands, gardens and cultivated fields, at altitudes of 0–2,650 metres (0–8,690 ft) above sea level.

== Description ==
This species is 18 to 19 cm (7.1 to 7.5 in) long. These small short-tailed starlings have a long narrow bill, robust bodies, strong feet and a distinctive plumage pattern. Adults have black heads and iridescent blue-to-green back, upper breast, wings, and tail. The belly is red-orange, separated from the blue breast by a white bar. The undertail coverts and the wing linings are white. Juveniles have duller plumage with no more than a suggestion of the white breast band. Their eyes are brown at first, later creamy white.

The superb starling has a long and loud song consisting of trills and chatters. At midday it gives a softer song of repeated phrases. There are several harsh calls, the most complex of which is described as "a shrill, screeching skerrrreeee-cherrrroo-tcherreeeeeet".

The appearance of the superb starling is very similar to Hildebrandt's starling, also found in East Africa. The superb starling is distinguished by having pale creamy-white eyes, as opposed to red eyes in the Hildebrandt's. Moreover, only adult superb starlings have a white breast band.

== Biology ==
The superb starling feeds primarily on the ground, often below, or in the vicinity of acacia trees. These birds mainly feeds on insects (grasshoppers, beetles, termites, ants and flies) and worms, but also on grains, fruits and small berries. They are gregarious and are generally rather tame and unafraid of people. The breeding season lasts from October to February in Ethiopia, from March to June in Somalia. Spherical nests of grasses and twigs are built in bushes, in trees of medium height and also in rock crevices. Females lay 3–4 eggs which are incubated for twelve days. Both the male and the female take care of the offspring.

== Gallery ==
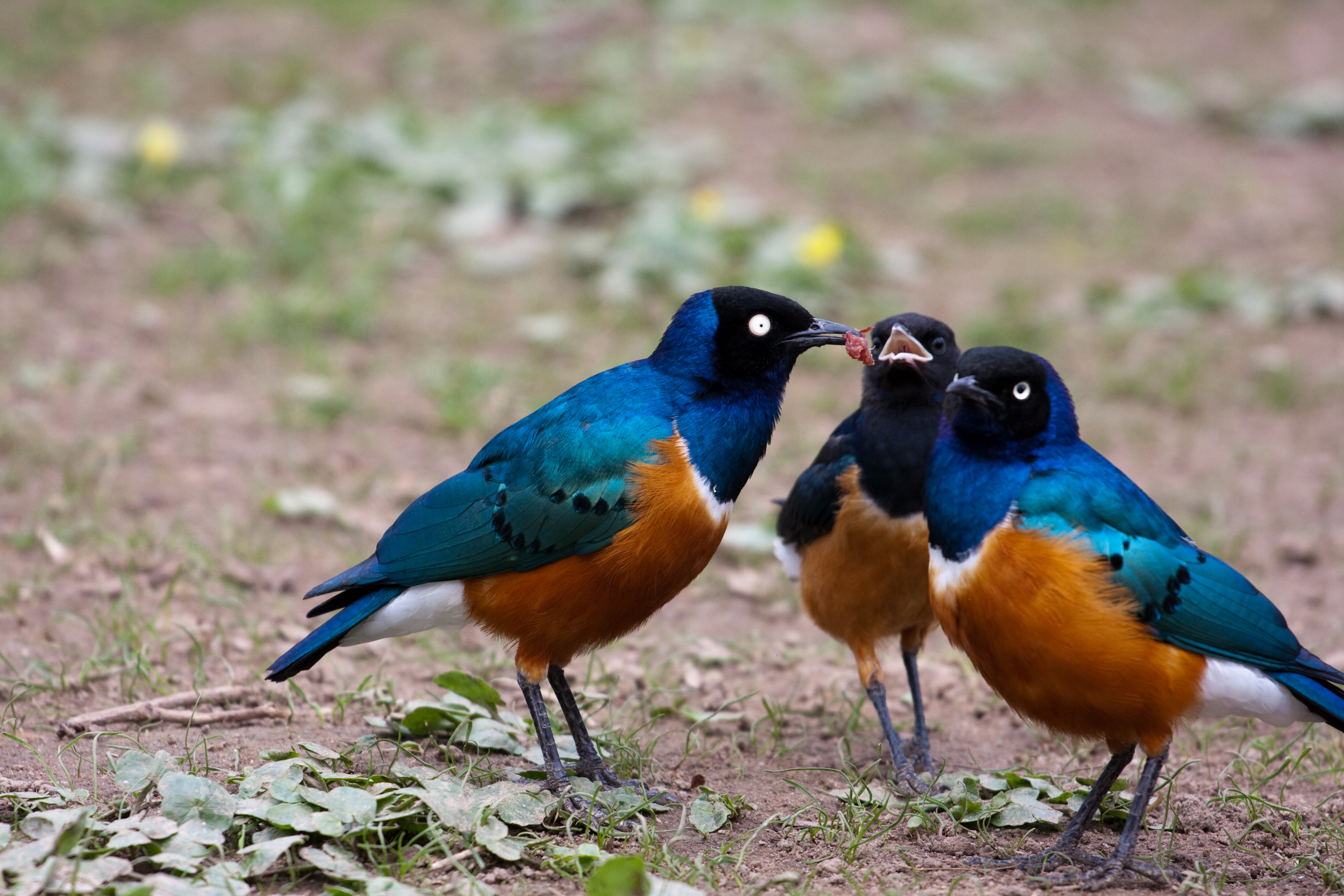
A family at Wilhelma Zoo. The paler-coloured juvenile is in the centre.

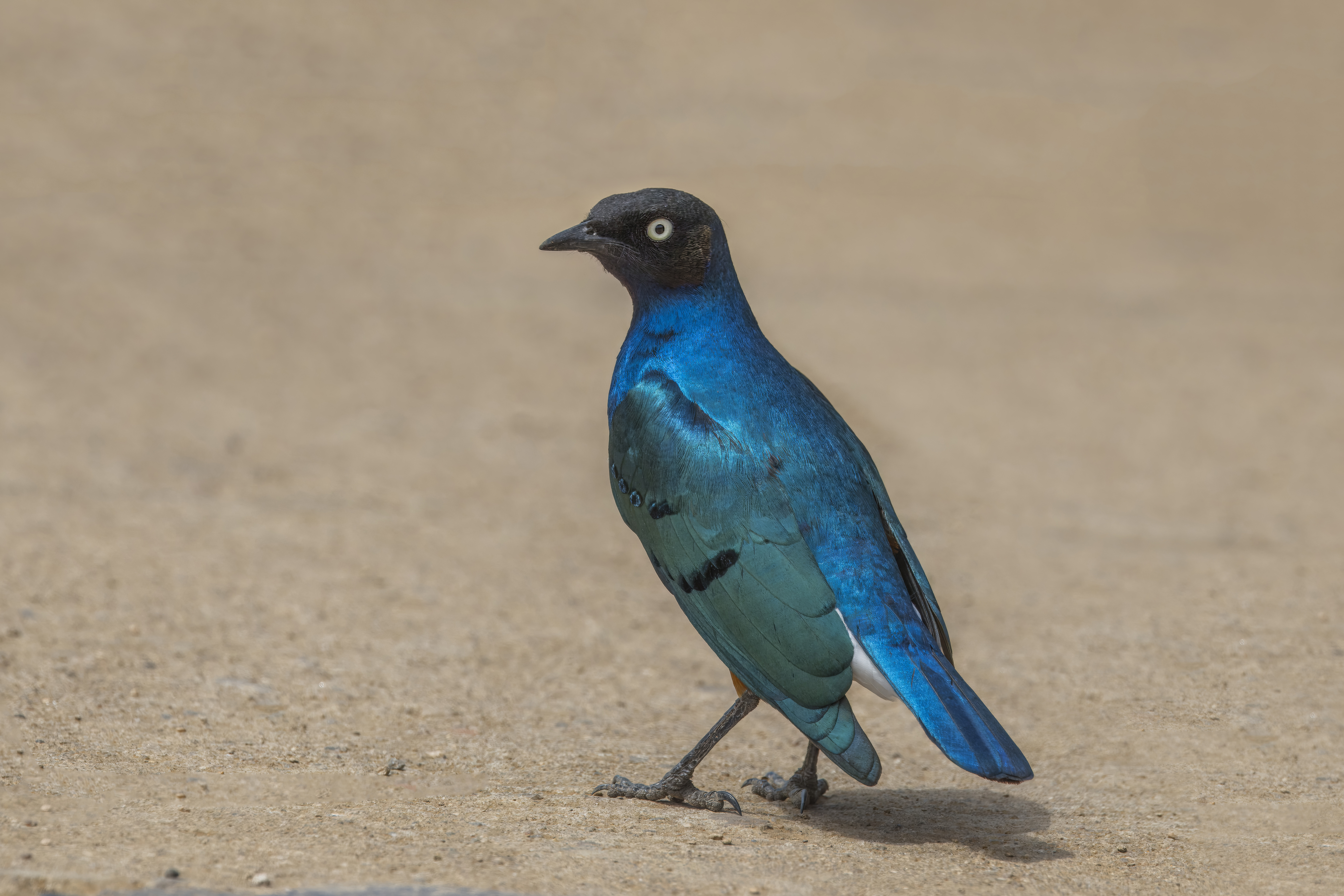
Showing back feathers

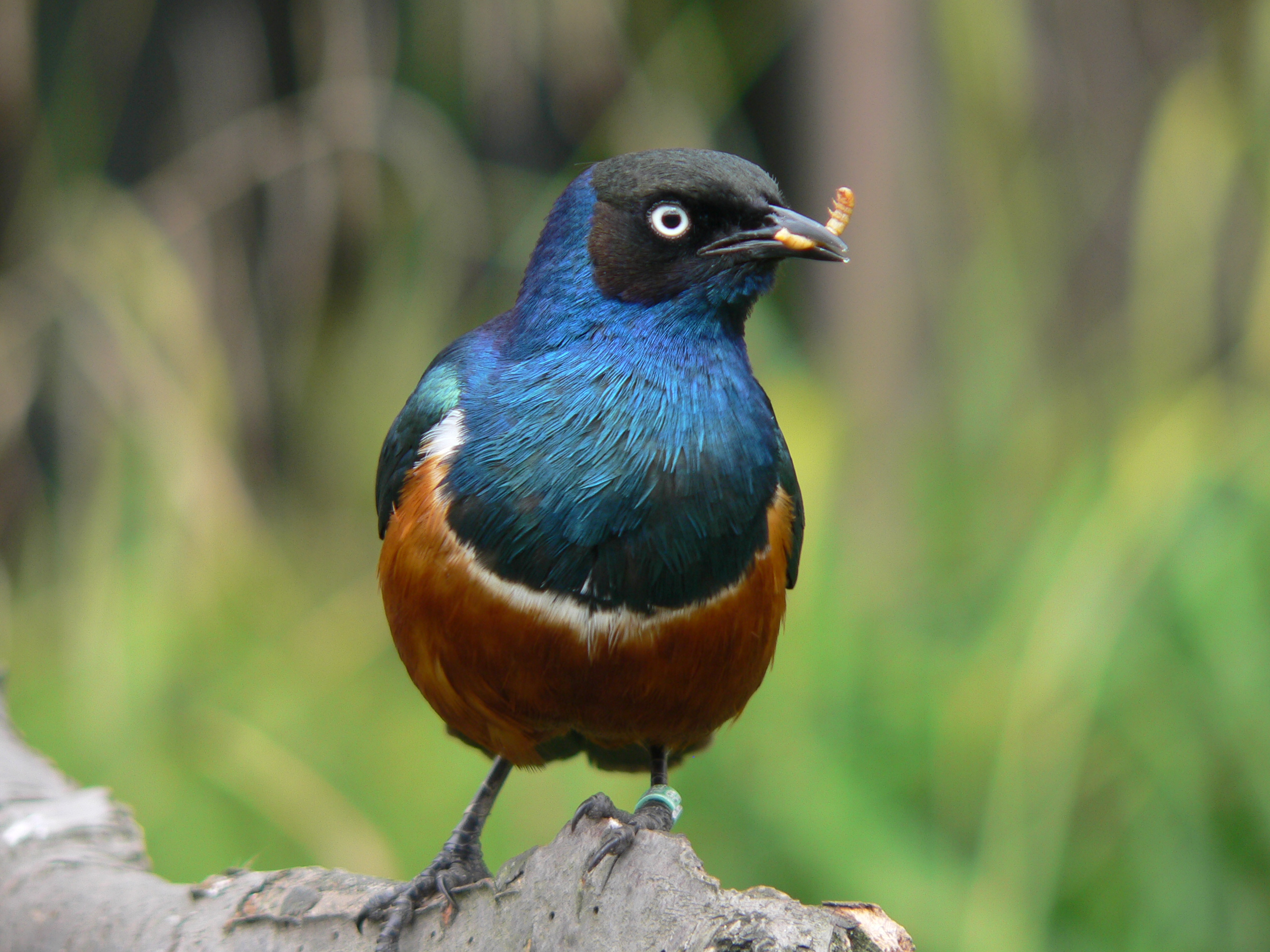
Feeding on a larva

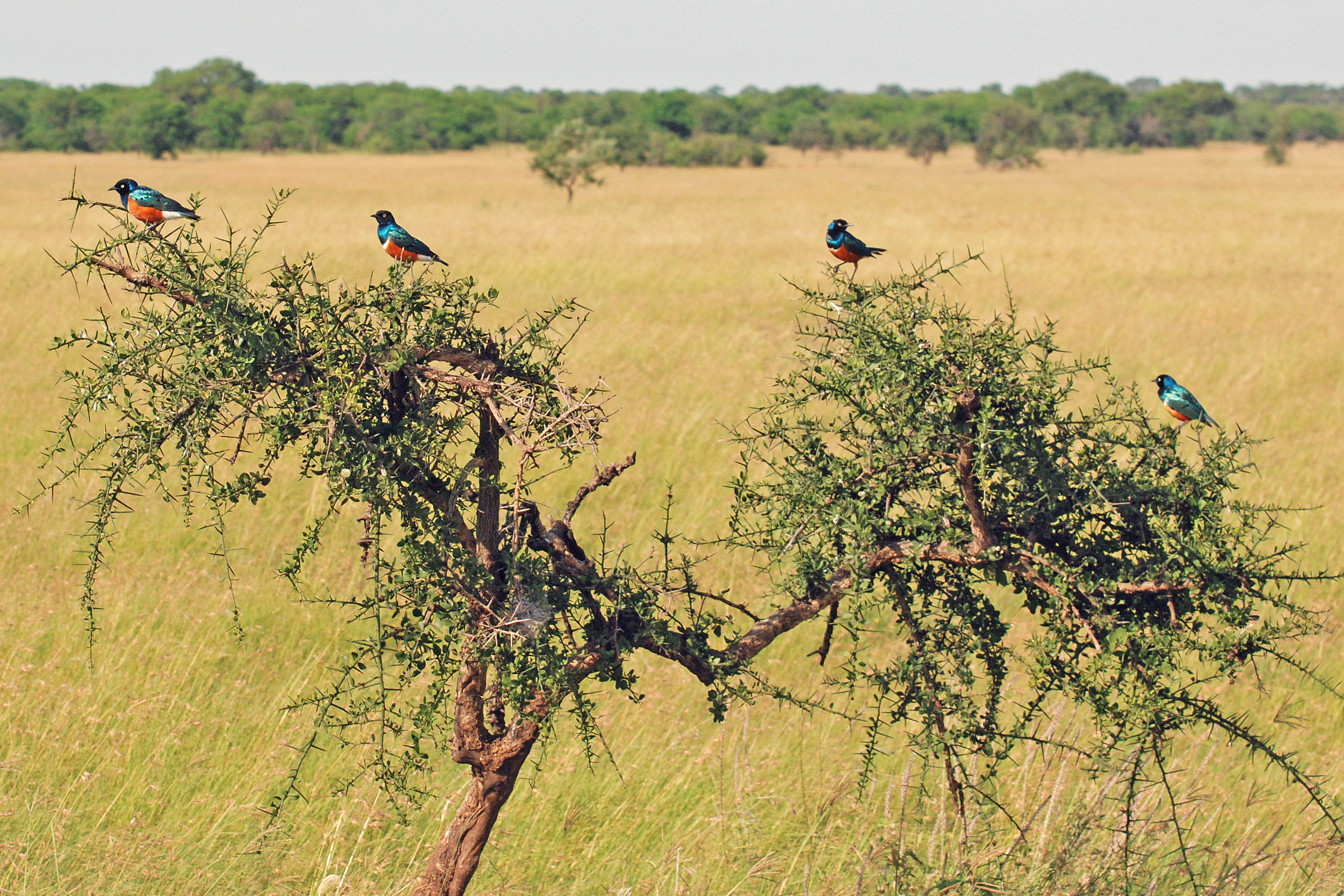
Habitat in Western Serengeti
