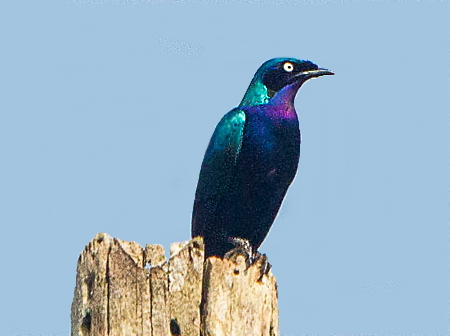
- At Kakum National Park, Ghana

Conservation status
- Least Concern (IUCN 3.1)

Scientific classification
- Kingdom: Animalia
- Phylum: Chordata
- Class: Aves
- Order: Passeriformes
- Family: Sturnidae
- Genus: Lamprotornis
- Species: L. splendidus

Binomial name
- Lamprotornis splendidus (Vieillot, 1822)
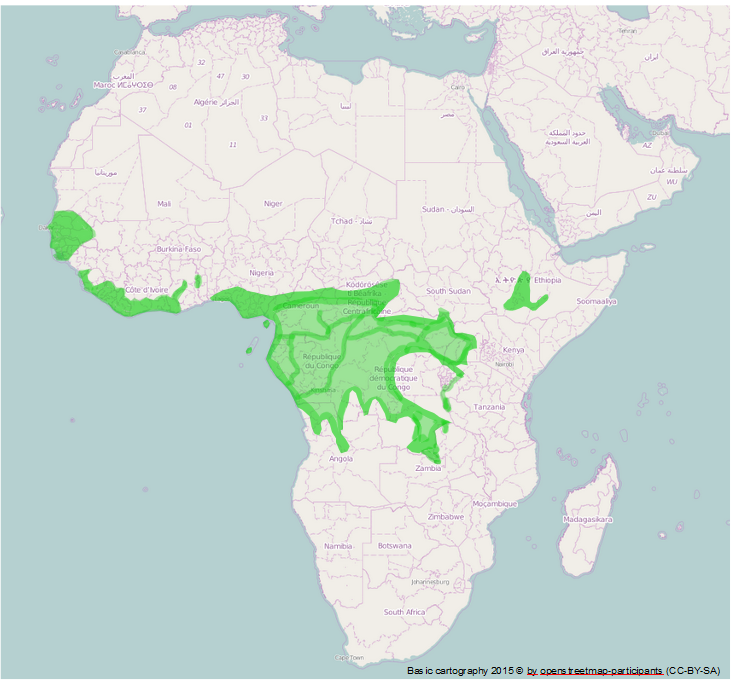
- native range in green

= Splendid starling =

Species of bird

The splendid starling (Lamprotornis splendidus), also known as the splendid glossy-starling, is a species of starling in the family Sturnidae.

== Range ==
It is found in Angola, Benin, Botswana, Burundi, Cameroon, the Central African Republic, the Republic of the Congo, the Democratic Republic of the Congo, Equatorial Guinea, Ethiopia, Gabon, Gambia, Ghana, Guinea, Guinea-Bissau, Kenya, Liberia, Mali, Niger, Nigeria, Rwanda, São Tomé and Príncipe, Senegal, Sierra Leone, South Sudan, Tanzania, Togo, Uganda, and Zambia — and is introduced in Belgium.

== Gallery ==
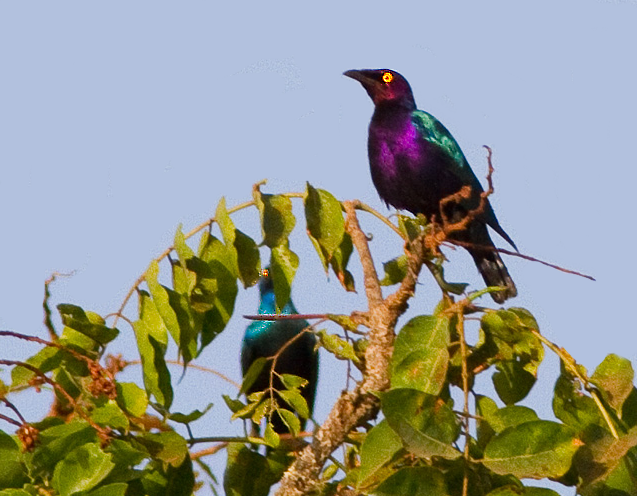
A pair in Cameroon

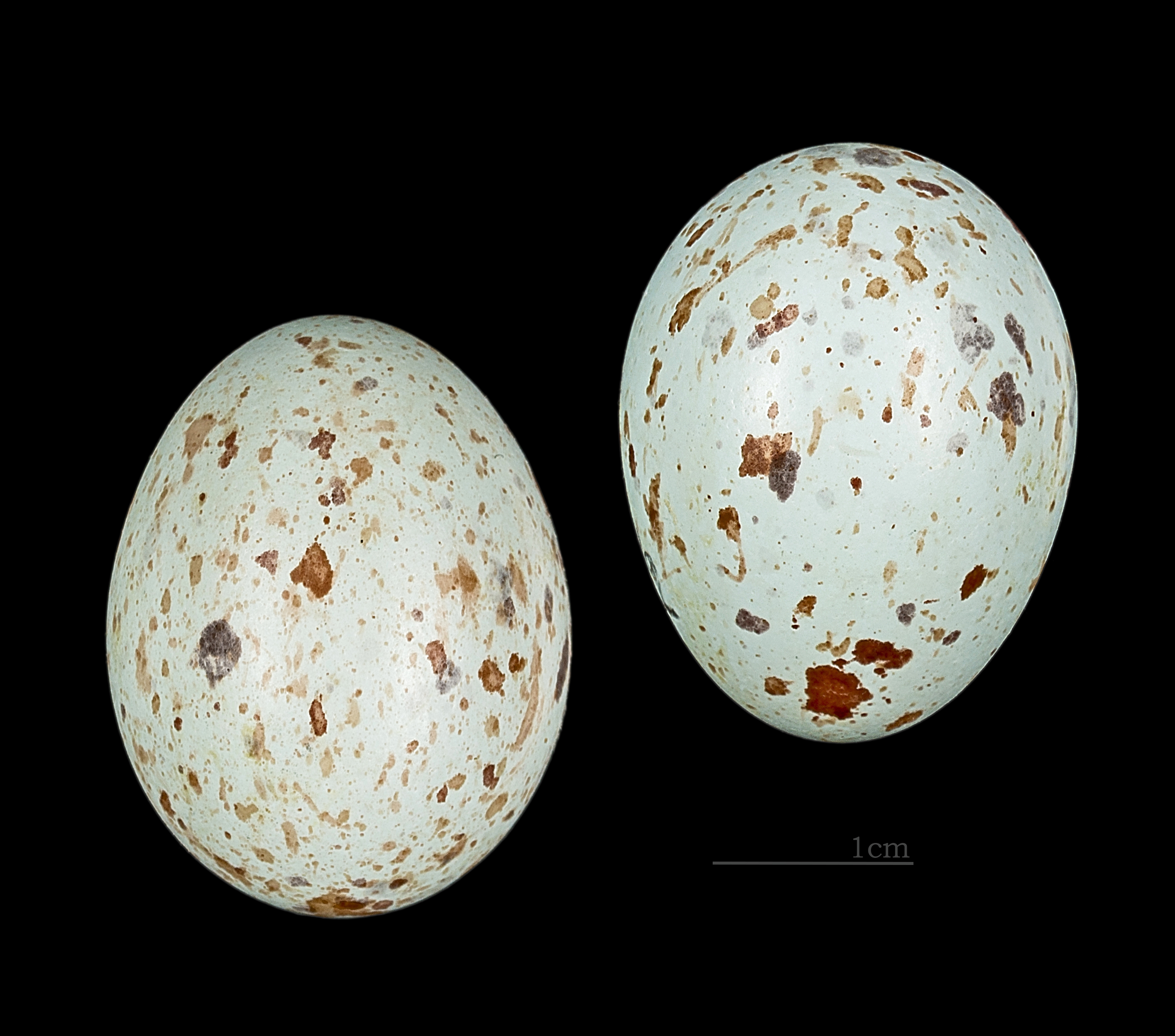
Eggs of L. splendidus – MHNT
