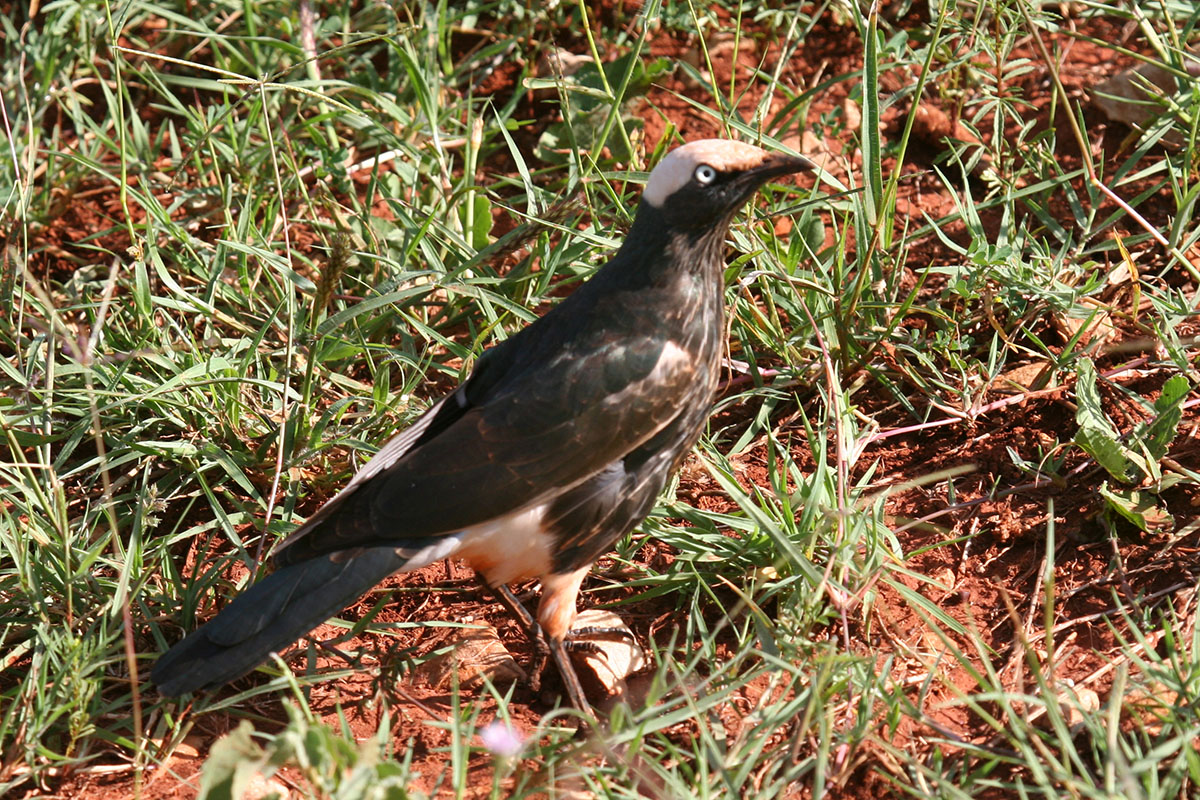

Conservation status
- Least Concern (IUCN 3.1)

Scientific classification
- Kingdom: Animalia
- Phylum: Chordata
- Class: Aves
- Order: Passeriformes
- Family: Sturnidae
- Genus: Lamprotornis
- Species: L. albicapillus

Binomial name
- Lamprotornis albicapillus (Blyth, 1855)

Synonyms
- Spreo albicapillus

= White-crowned starling =

Species of bird

The white-crowned starling (Lamprotornis albicapillus) is a species of starling in the family Sturnidae. It is found in Djibouti, Ethiopia, Kenya, and Somalia.
