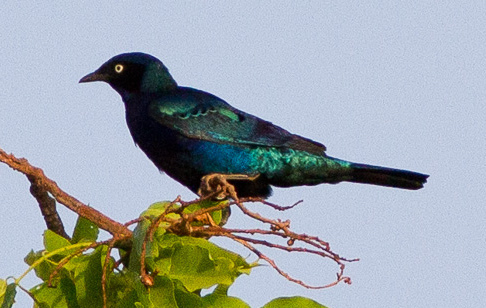
- In Cameroon

Conservation status
- Least Concern (IUCN 3.1)

Scientific classification
- Kingdom: Animalia
- Phylum: Chordata
- Class: Aves
- Order: Passeriformes
- Family: Sturnidae
- Genus: Lamprotornis
- Species: L. chalcurus

Binomial name
- Lamprotornis chalcurus Nordmann, 1835
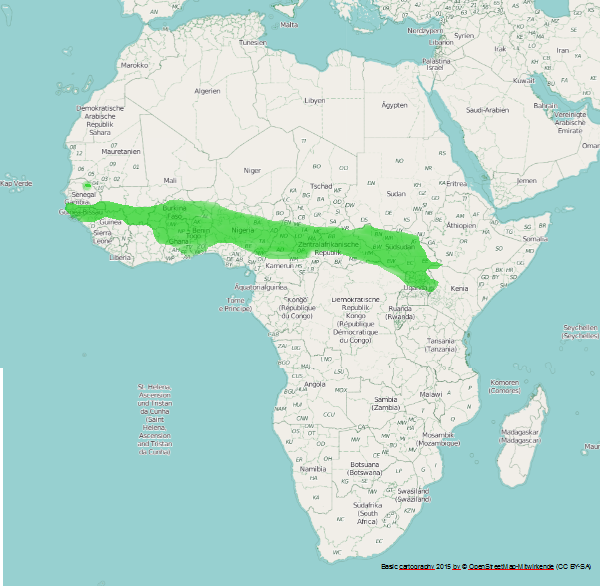
- native range

= Bronze-tailed starling =

Species of bird

The bronze-tailed starling or bronze-tailed glossy-starling (Lamprotornis chalcurus) is a species of starling in the family Sturnidae. It is native to the Sudan and adjacent areas.
