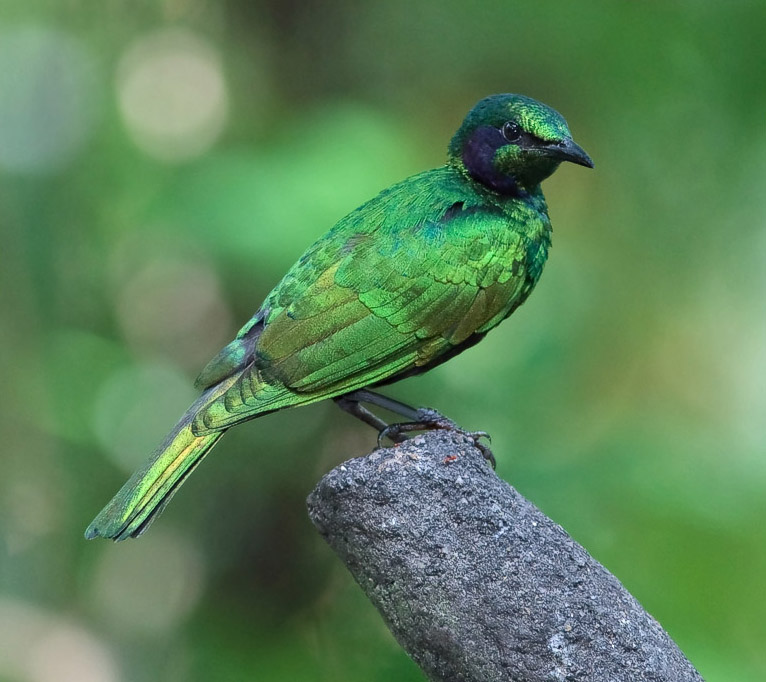

Conservation status
- Least Concern (IUCN 3.1)

Scientific classification
- Kingdom: Animalia
- Phylum: Chordata
- Class: Aves
- Order: Passeriformes
- Family: Sturnidae
- Genus: Lamprotornis
- Species: L. iris

Binomial name
- Lamprotornis iris (Oustalet, 1879)

Synonyms
- Coccycolius iris

= Emerald starling =

Species of bird

The emerald starling (Lamprotornis iris), also known as the iris glossy starling, is a species of starling occurring in West Africa, where it inhabits lowlands and savanna of Côte d'Ivoire, Guinea and Sierra Leone. It was formerly sometimes treated in its own monotypic genus Coccycolius, but genetic studies have now shown it to be a typical member of the glossy starlings in the genus Lamprotornis.

== Description ==
It is a medium-small sized starling, at 21 cm long similar in size to the common starling. It has an iridescent metallic green crown, upper body, wings and tail. The ear-coverts and underparts are metallic purple. The bill and the legs are black. Both sexes are similar; the juveniles are glossy olive-green above, but duller, matt greyish-brown below, lacking the iridescent gloss of the adults there.

== Behaviour ==
The emerald starling feeds on figs, Haronga berries and other fruit, seeds, ants and other small insects. The cup-shaped nest is built in a tree cavity. The male and female cooperate in building the nest from leaves, and both bring food to chicks after they hatch.

== Status ==
It was formerly classified as data deficient by the IUCN, as available data was insufficient for judging its conservation status. Studies found that it was relatively widespread and locally common, and in 2015 its IUCN rating was changed to least concern. The emerald starling is caught for the wildlife trade and is locally threatened by mining activities, but overall, this is unlikely to cause a major decline in the species.

== Gallery ==
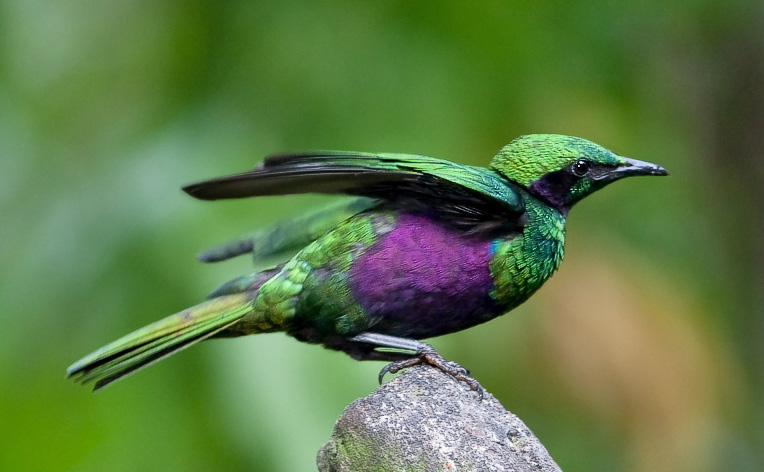

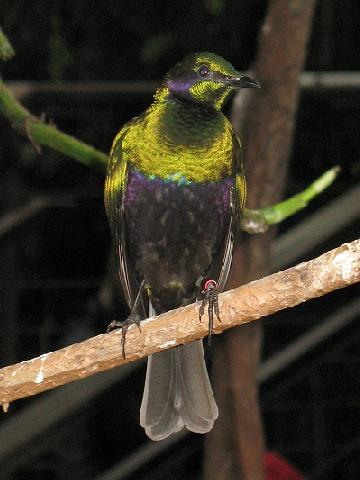

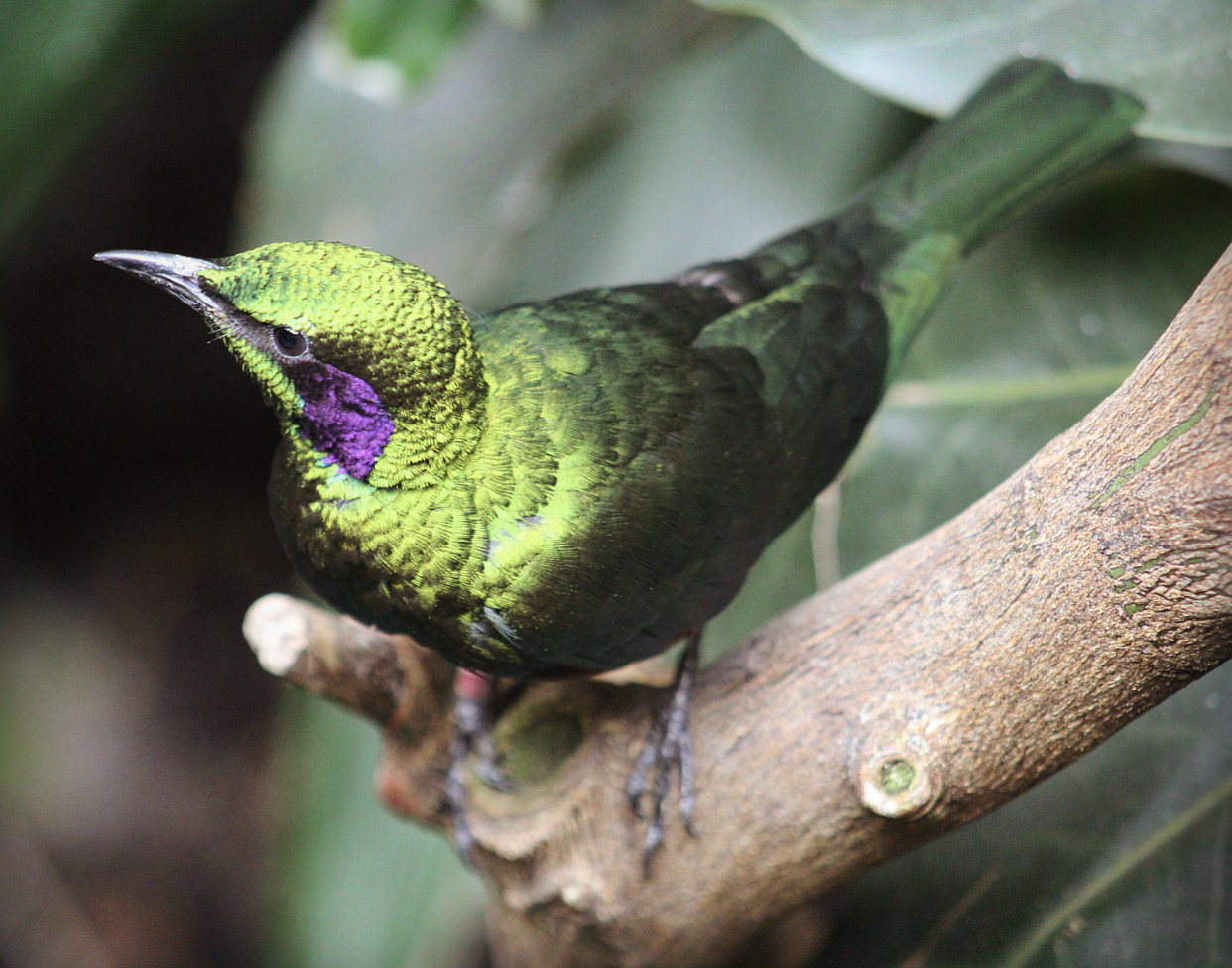
