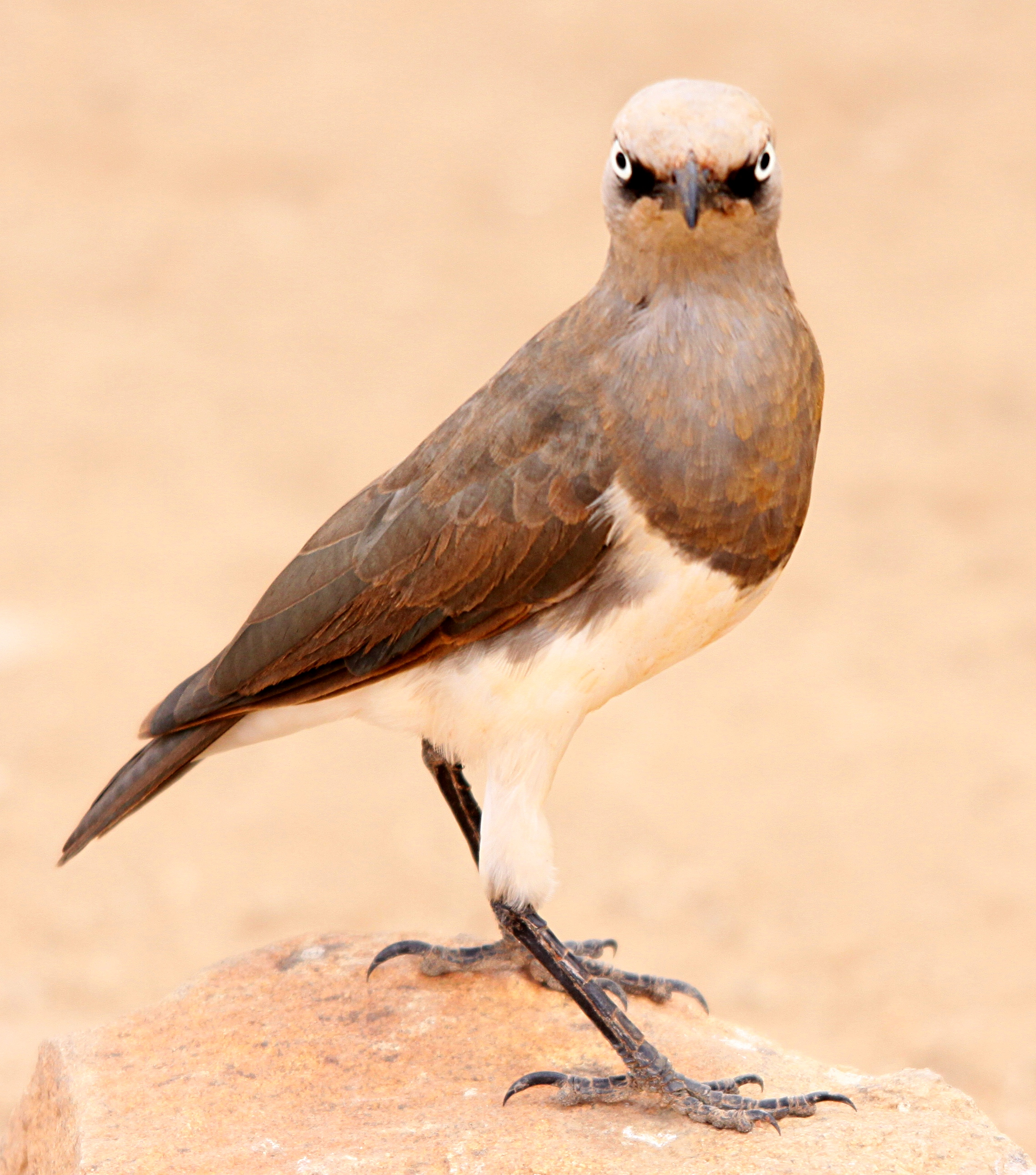

Conservation status
- Least Concern (IUCN 3.1)

Scientific classification
- Kingdom: Animalia
- Phylum: Chordata
- Class: Aves
- Order: Passeriformes
- Family: Sturnidae
- Genus: Lamprotornis
- Species: L. fischeri

Binomial name
- Lamprotornis fischeri (Reichenow, 1884)
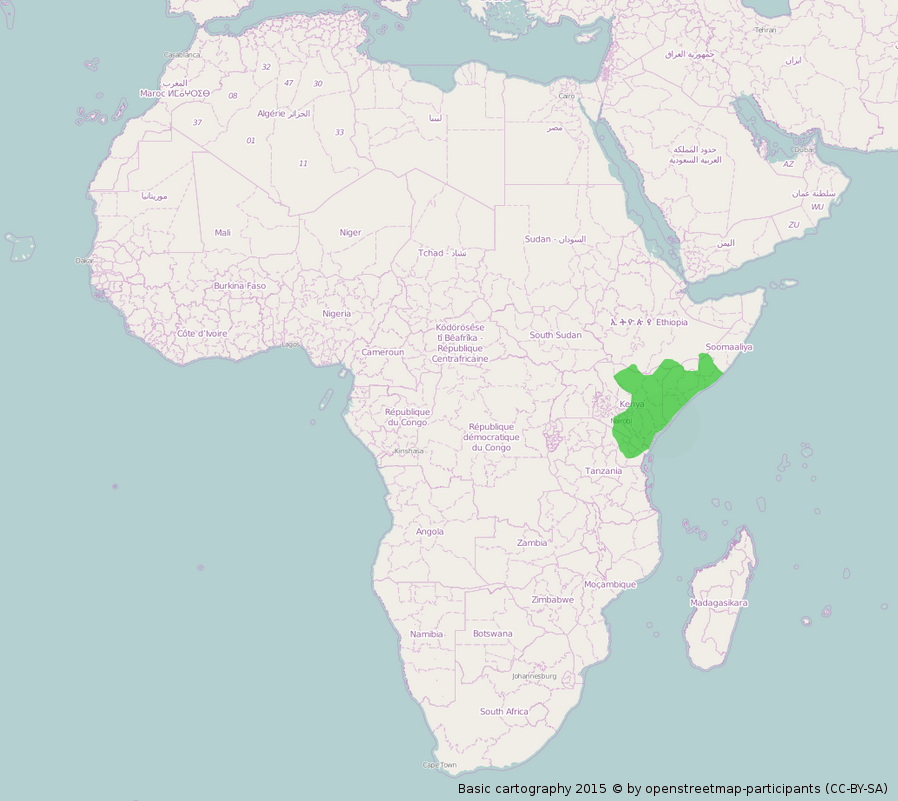
- native range

Synonyms
- Spreo fischeri

= Fischer's starling =

Species of bird

Fischer's starling (Lamprotornis fischeri) is a bird which is an uncommon resident breeder from southern Ethiopia and Somalia to eastern Kenya and Tanzania. It is found in dry open acacia thornbush.

The English and scientific names commemorate the 19th century German explorer of East Africa Gustav Fischer.

== Description ==
The adult of this 18 cm (7.1 in) long, 51 g (1.8 oz) starling has mainly dully ash-grey plumage except for a white lower chest, belly and undertail. It has a white iris and dark bill. The sexes are alike, but the juvenile has browner plumage, a brown iris and a dull yellow lower mandible. There are no subspecies.

This species has a number of calls, but the most familiar is a wheezing cree-wee-creewoo. There is also a loud whistle and a metallic song.

== Behaviour ==
=== Breeding ===
Fischer's starling usually nests in thorn trees, typically 2.5 m (8 ft 2 in) above the ground. The roofed nest is made from grasses and lined with feathers. It has a ramp and opening in its side. Up to six red-spotted blue eggs make up the clutch, and are laid in April to May and September to November.

Both parents feed the chicks, assisted by helpers, which are typically subadult or unmated birds.

=== Feeding ===
Like other starlings, Fischer's starling is an omnivore, and sometimes takes fruit and berries, but its diet is mainly insects, taken from the ground. It normally forages alone or in pairs, but will form mixed flocks with wattled starlings.
