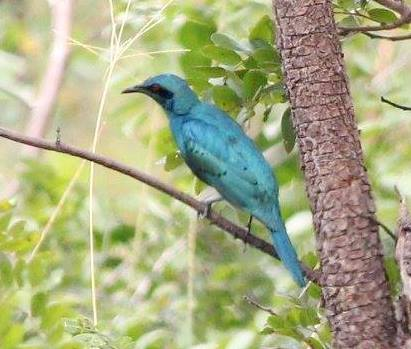

Conservation status
- Least Concern (IUCN 3.1)

Scientific classification
- Kingdom: Animalia
- Phylum: Chordata
- Class: Aves
- Order: Passeriformes
- Family: Sturnidae
- Genus: Lamprotornis
- Species: L. acuticaudus

Binomial name
- Lamprotornis acuticaudus (Barboza du Bocage, 1869)
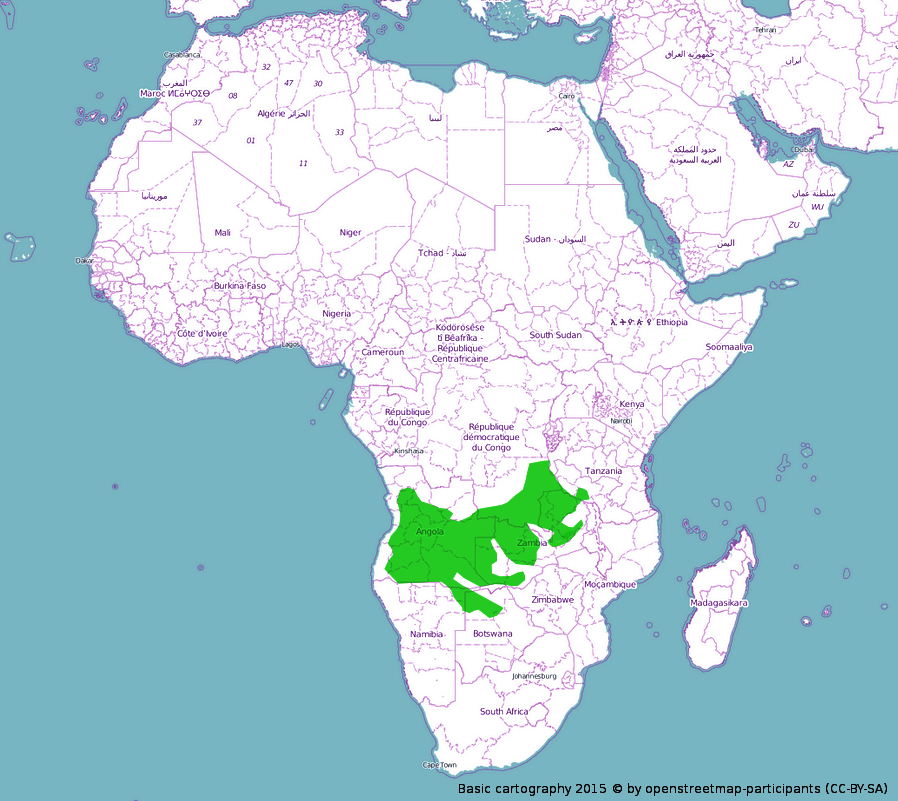
- native range

= Sharp-tailed starling =

Species of bird

The sharp-tailed starling (Lamprotornis acuticaudus), also known as the sharp-tailed glossy-starling, is a species of starling in the family Sturnidae.

== Range ==
It inhabits open woodland (namely miombo) in Angola, northern Botswana, the southern DRC, northern Namibia, western Tanzania, and Zambia.

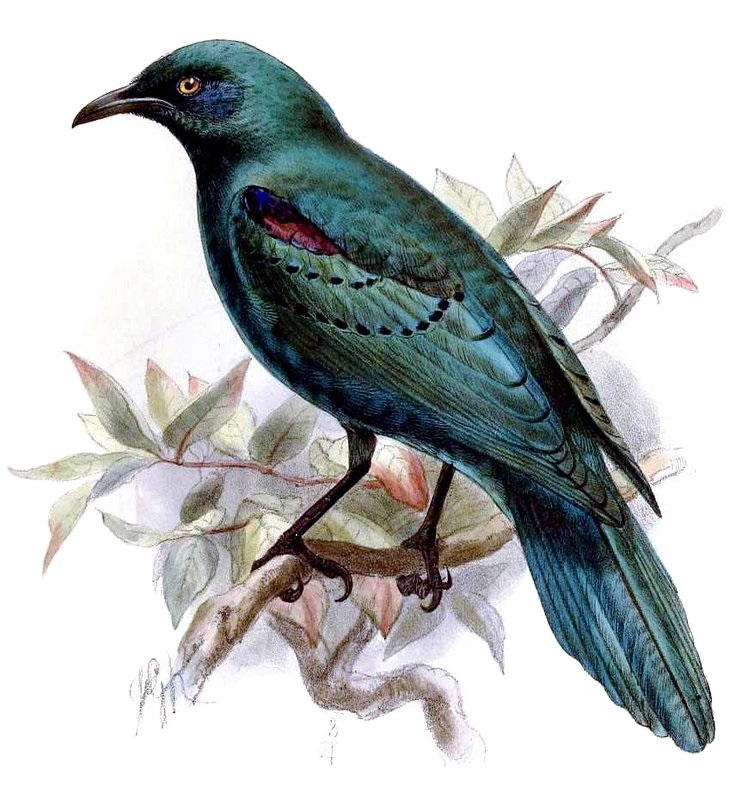
Illustration by Keulemans showing the pointed tail shape
