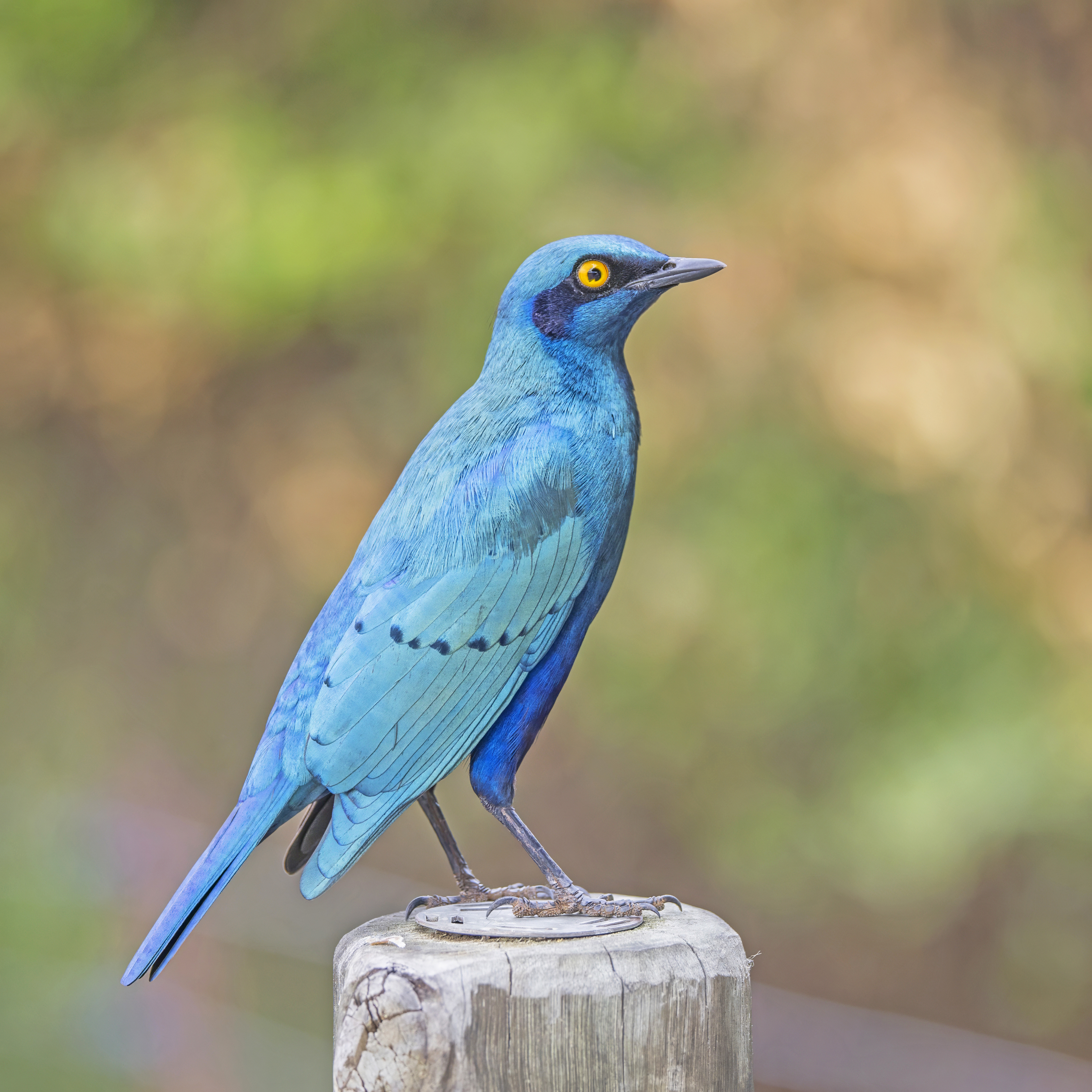
- Greater blue-eared starling, L. chalybaeus normanni

Scientific classification
- Kingdom: Animalia
- Phylum: Chordata
- Class: Aves
- Order: Passeriformes
- Family: Sturnidae
- Genus: Lamprotornis; Temminck, 1820

Type species
- Turdus caudatus Statius Muller, 1776

Species
- About 20, see text

= Lamprotornis =

Genus of birds

Lamprotornis is a large genus of glossy starlings all of which occur in Africa south of the Sahara. They have glossy blue or green upper parts, which is due to hollow melanin granules arranged in a single layer near the feather barbule's surface. This unique arrangement led to some glossy starlings formerly placed in the genus Spreo being transferred to Lamprotornis, since they shared this feature (but see also below).

The genus Lamprotornis was introduced by the Dutch zoologist Coenraad Jacob Temminck in 1820. The type species was subsequently designated as the long-tailed glossy starling.

The under parts of these species lack iridescence. They may be blue, purple, yellow or brown. Most Lamprotornis starlings have striking yellow or red irides and some have long tails.

These glossy starlings are found in a variety of habitats from forests to open woodland and gardens. They nest in tree holes, either natural, or made by woodpeckers or barbets, and some will use man-made structures. Most species are resident apart from seasonal or local movement, but Shelley's starling is migratory. Most species are gregarious outside the breeding season.

Lamprotornis glossy starlings are omnivorous and mostly feed on the ground, although they will take fruit from trees. Some will feed on or near large mammals to find insects.

== Species ==
The genus contains 22 species.

Common name	Scientific name	Image	Distribution
Cape starling	Lamprotornis nitens		Southern Africa
Greater blue-eared starling	Lamprotornis chalybaeus		Senegal east to Ethiopia and south through eastern Africa to northeastern South Africa and Angola
Lesser blue-eared starling	Lamprotornis chloropterus		widespread in sub-Saharan Africa
Bronze-tailed starling	Lamprotornis chalcurus		Senegal through Nigeria to South Sudan and Kenya
Splendid starling	Lamprotornis splendidus		widespread in western and central Africa
Principe starling	Lamprotornis ornatus		endemic to São Tomé and Príncipe
Emerald starling	Lamprotornis iris (formerly Coccycolius iris)		Guinea, Sierra Leone and Ivory Coast
Purple starling	Lamprotornis purpureus		tropical Africa from Senegal and northern Zaire east to Sudan and west Kenya
Rüppell's starling	Lamprotornis purpuroptera		Sudan, Eritrea and Ethiopia to Tanzania
Long-tailed glossy starling	Lamprotornis caudatus		tropical Africa from Senegal east to Sudan.
Golden-breasted starling	Lamprotornis regius		Ethiopia and Somalia to northern Tanzania
Meves's starling	Lamprotornis mevesii		southern Africa
Burchell's starling	Lamprotornis australis		southern Africa
Sharp-tailed starling	Lamprotornis acuticaudus		southern central Africa
Superb starling	Lamprotornis superbus (formerly Spreo superbus)		eastern Africa
Hildebrandt's starling	Lamprotornis hildebrandti (formerly Notauges hildebrandti)		Ethiopia and Somalia to Kenya.
Shelley's starling,	Lamprotornis shelleyi		eastern Africa
Chestnut-bellied starling	Lamprotornis pulcher (formerly Spreo pulcher)		Burkina Faso and western Africa
Ashy starling	Lamprotornis unicolor (formerly Spreo unicolor)		Kenya and Tanzania
Pied starling	Lamprotornis bicolor (formerly Spreo bicolor)		South Africa, Lesotho and Swaziland
Fischer's starling	Lamprotornis fischeri (formerly Spreo fischeri)		southern Ethiopia and Somalia to eastern Kenya and Tanzania
White-crowned starling	Lamprotornis albicapillus (formerly Spreo albicapillus)		Djibouti, Ethiopia, Kenya, and Somalia.

The limits of this genus have seen recent revision following phylogenetic analysis with molecular markers. For example, the black-bellied starling is now placed in a separate genus Notopholia. On the other hand, genera such as Coccycolius, Spreo and Compsarus were found nested in Lamprotornis and have been merged.
