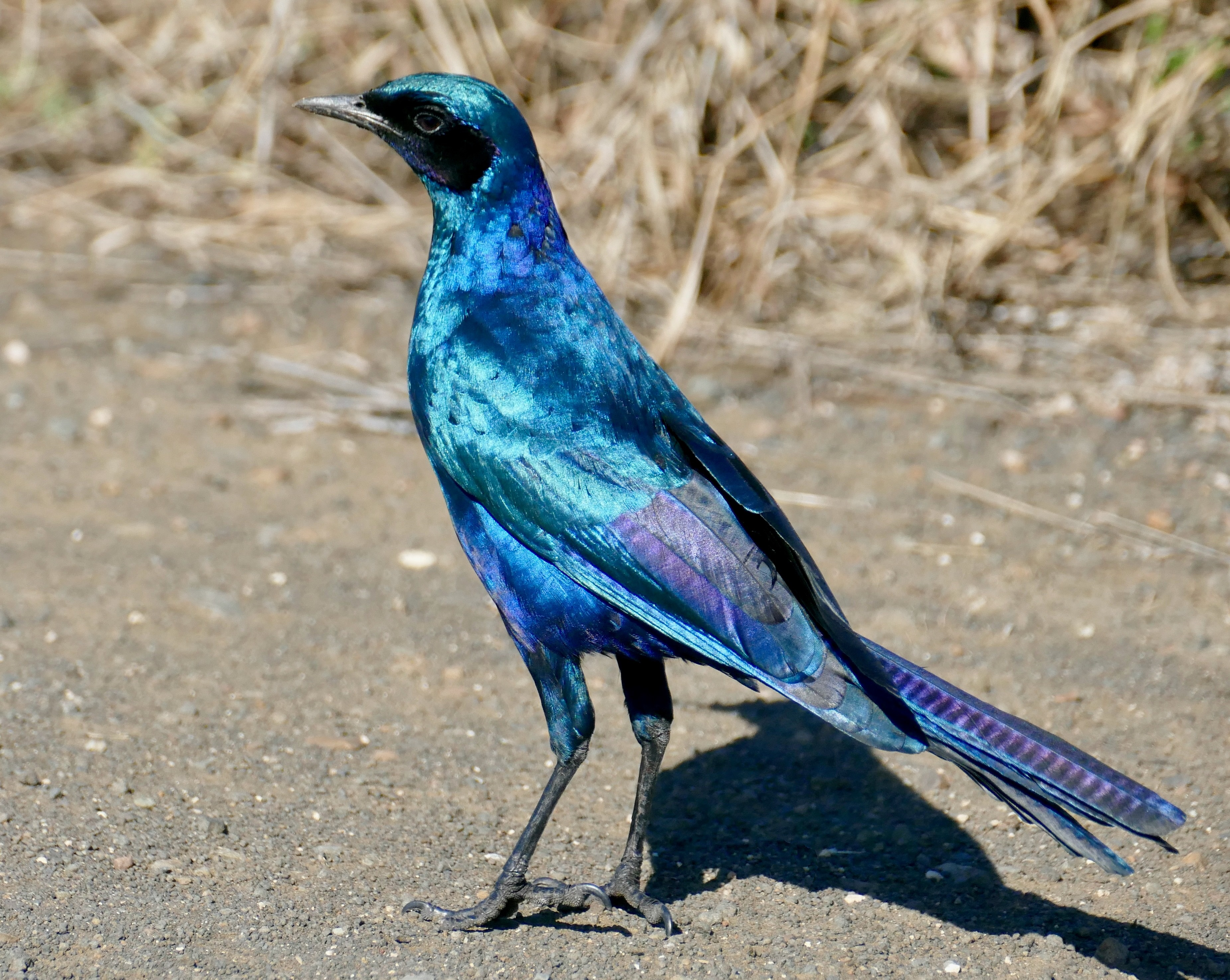

Conservation status
- Least Concern (IUCN 3.1)

Scientific classification
- Kingdom: Animalia
- Phylum: Chordata
- Class: Aves
- Order: Passeriformes
- Family: Sturnidae
- Genus: Lamprotornis
- Species: L. australis

Binomial name
- Lamprotornis australis (Smith, 1836)
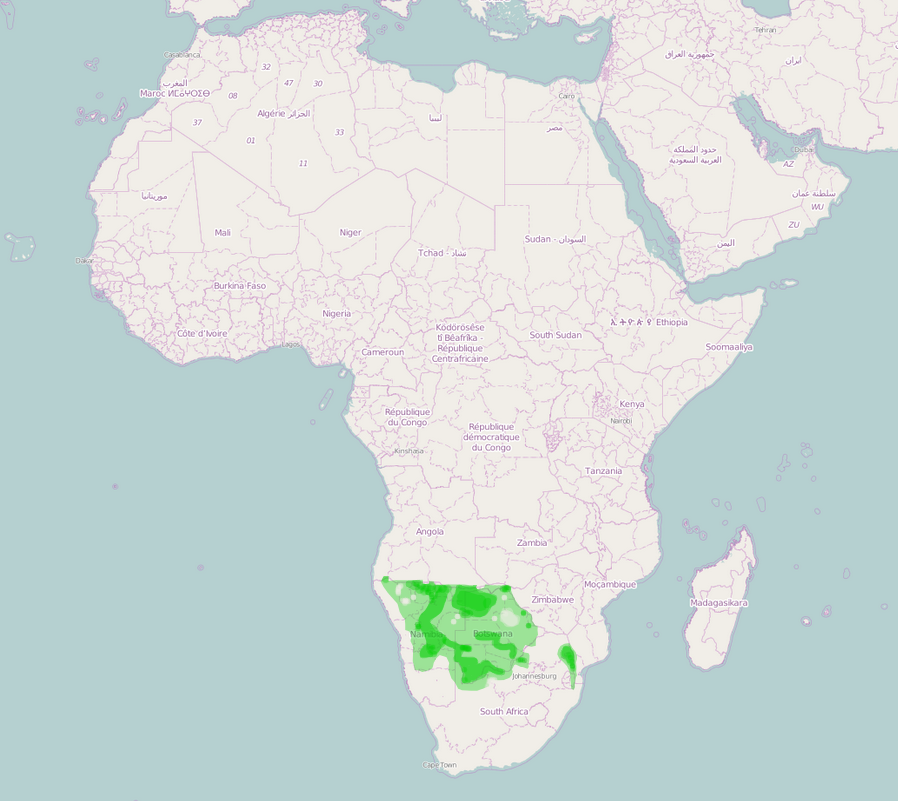
- low density range high density range

Synonyms
- Megalopterus australis A.Smith, 1836 (protonym)

= Burchell's starling =

Species of bird

Burchell's starling (Lamprotornis australis) or Burchell's glossy-starling is a species of starling in the family Sturnidae. The monogamous and presumably sedentary species is native to dry and mesic woodlands and savannah of southern Africa. The name of this bird commemorates the English naturalist William John Burchell.

== Range and habitat ==
This species is found in Angola, Botswana, Eswatini, Mozambique, Namibia, South Africa, Zambia, and Zimbabwe. It is absent from miombo woodland, but is present in westerly gusu woodlands.

== Habits and food ==
In the Kalahari they associate with camelthorn trees and also feed on their flowers. Their food includes flowers, fruit and small animals. They breed during the summer months.

== Status and numbers ==
The species is not threatened and is locally common in conservation areas.
