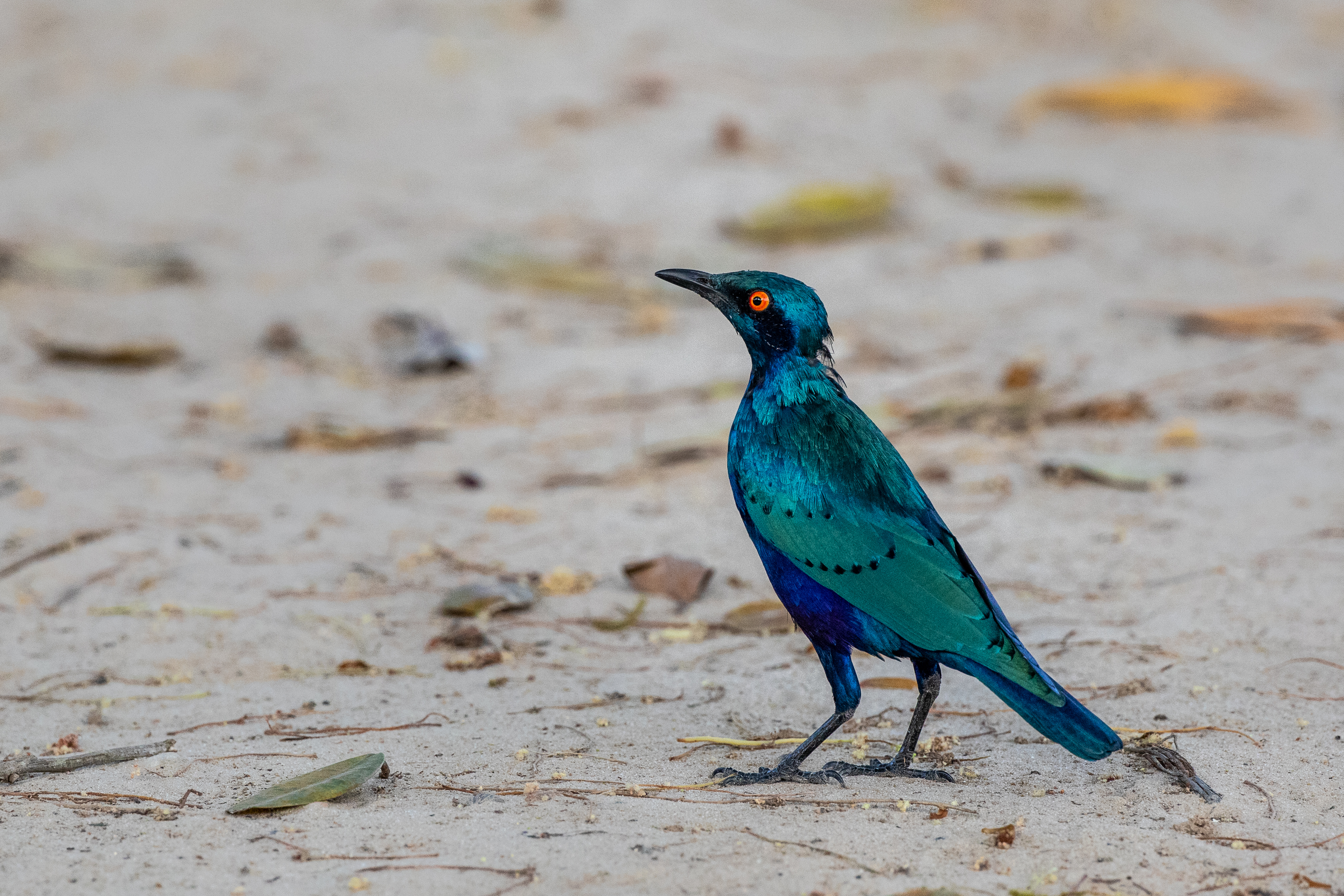
- L. c. chloropterus in Senegal
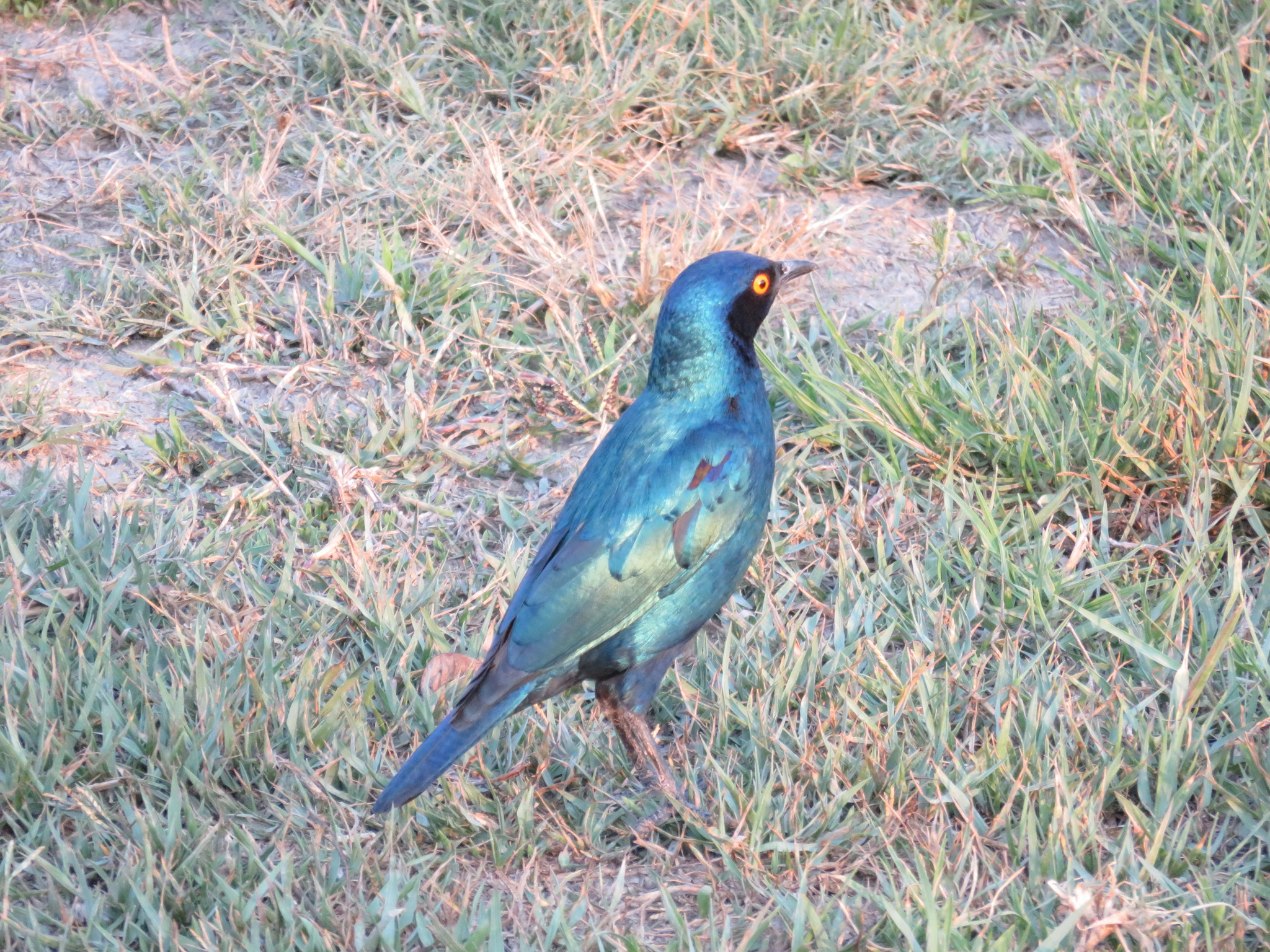
- L. c. elisabeth in Zimbabwe

Conservation status
- Least Concern (IUCN 3.1)

Scientific classification
- Kingdom: Animalia
- Phylum: Chordata
- Class: Aves
- Order: Passeriformes
- Family: Sturnidae
- Genus: Lamprotornis
- Species: L. chloropterus

Binomial name
- Lamprotornis chloropterus Swainson, 1838
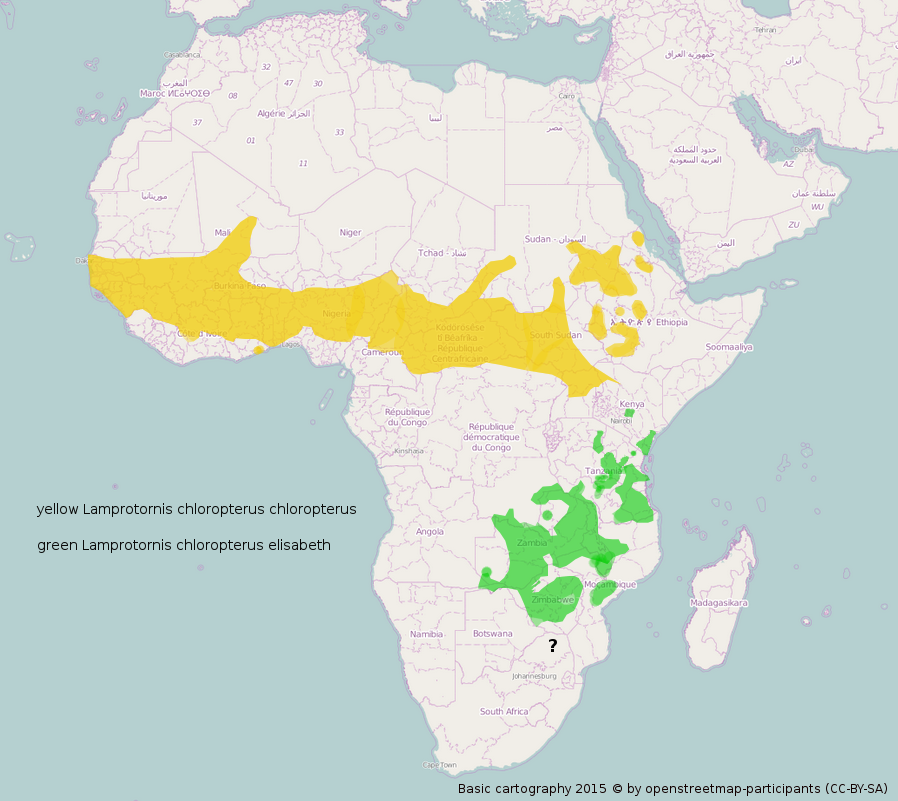
- Ranges of northern and southern race L. c. chloropterus L. c. elisabeth

= Lesser blue-eared starling =

Species of bird

The lesser blue-eared starling or lesser blue-eared glossy-starling (Lamprotornis chloropterus) is a species of starling in the family Sturnidae. It is found in Benin, Burkina Faso, Burundi, Cameroon, the Central African Republic, Chad, the Democratic Republic of the Congo, Eritrea, Ethiopia, Gambia, Ghana, Guinea, Guinea-Bissau, Ivory Coast, Kenya, Liberia, Malawi, Malaysia, Mali, Mozambique, Namibia, Nigeria, Senegal, Sierra Leone, South Sudan, Sudan, Tanzania, Togo, Uganda, Zambia, and Zimbabwe.

== Taxonomy ==
The lesser blue-eared starling was formally described in 1838 by the English zoologist William Swainson under the current binomial name Lamprotornis chloropterus based on a specimen collected in West Africa. The specific epithet combines the Ancient Greek χλωρος/khlōros meaning "yellow" with -πτερος/-pteros meaning "-winged".

Two subspecies are recognised:

- L. c. chloropterus Swainson, 1838 – Senegal, Gambia and Guinea to Eritrea, Ethiopia and Kenya
- L. c. elisabeth (Stresemann, 1924) – south Kenya to north Botswana and Zimbabwe

The subspecies L. c. elisabeth has sometimes been considered as a separate species, the Miombo blue-eared starling.

== Behaviour ==
During the non-breeding season, it forms roosts of 500-1200 individuals.

It eats insects and grains.

It is sometimes kept as a pet.

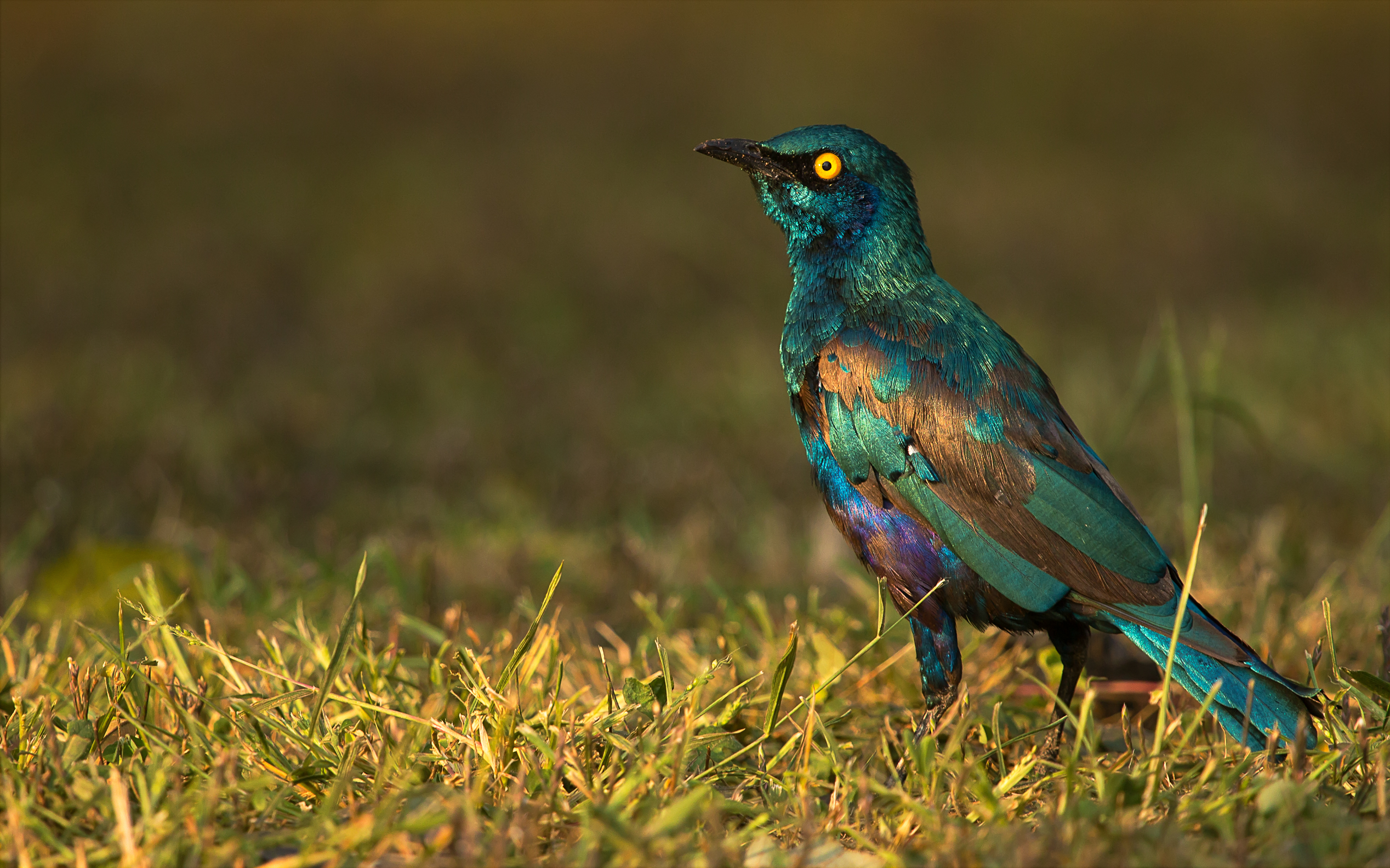
An immature bird in Ghana, moulting into adult plumage
