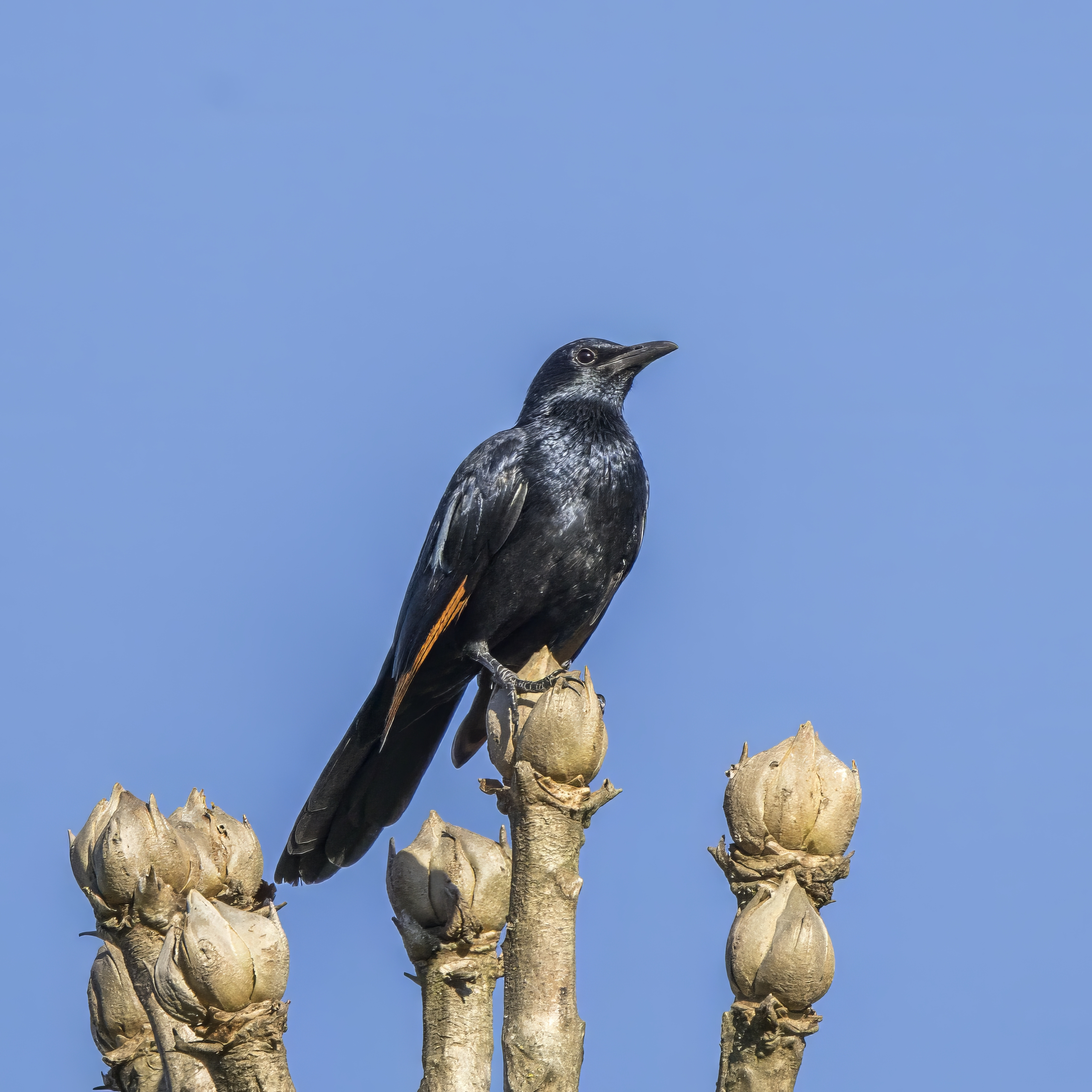
- Male
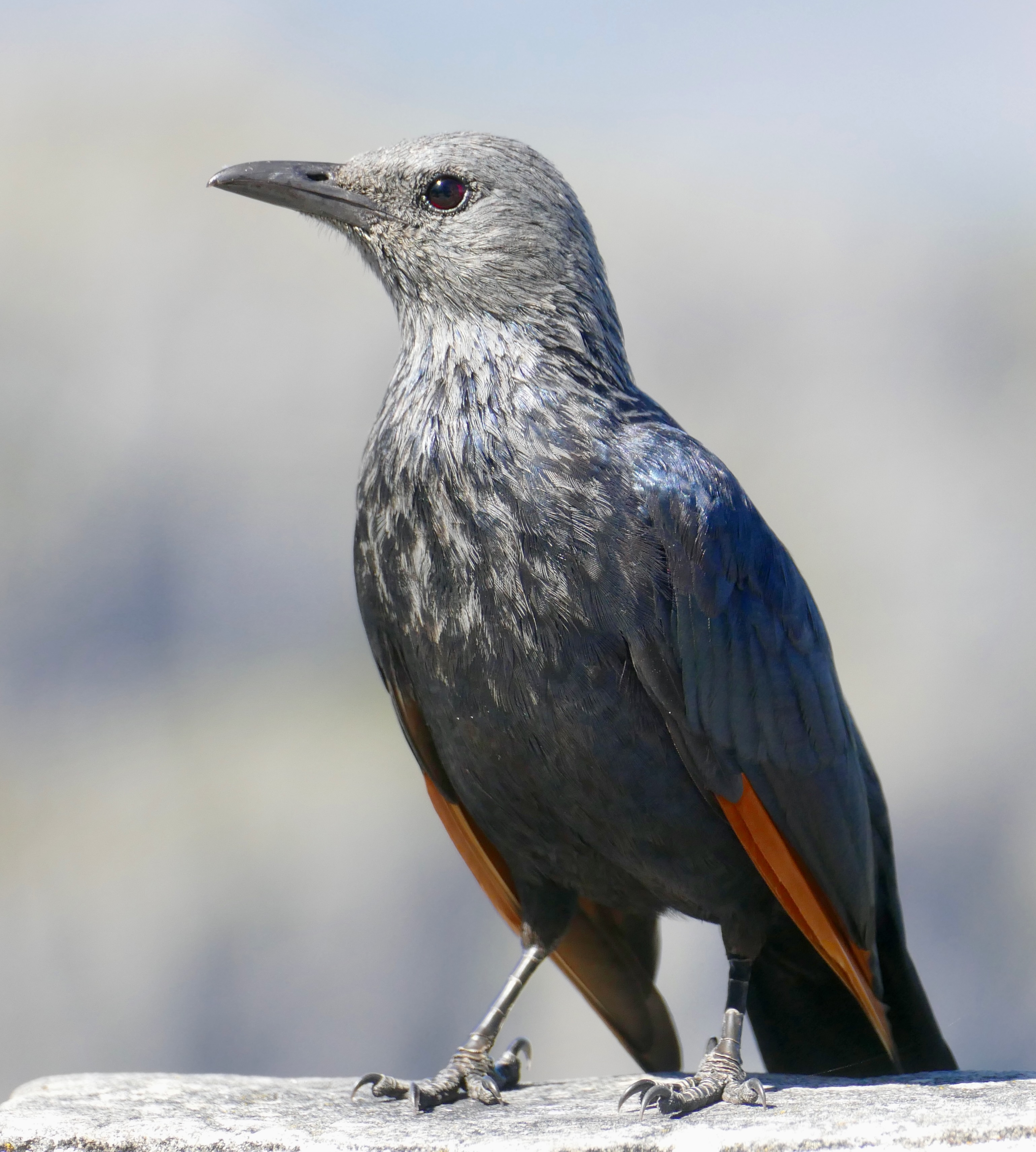
- Female; Both in South Africa

Conservation status
- Least Concern (IUCN 3.1)

Scientific classification
- Kingdom: Animalia
- Phylum: Chordata
- Class: Aves
- Order: Passeriformes
- Family: Sturnidae
- Genus: Onychognathus
- Species: O. morio

Binomial name
- Onychognathus morio (Linnaeus, 1766)
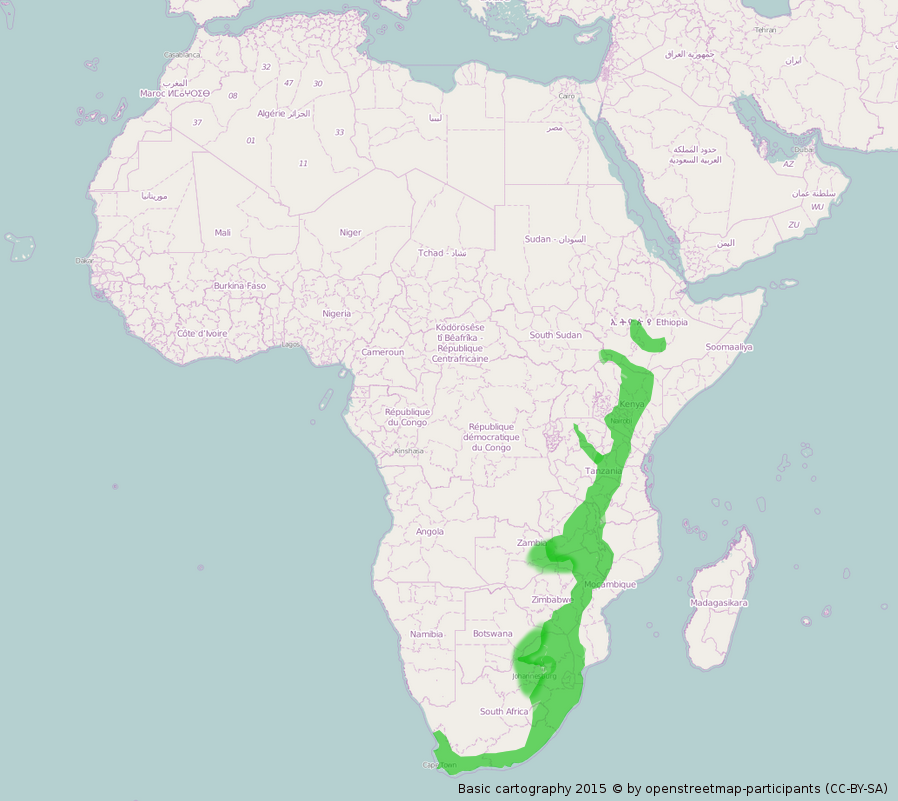
- native range

Synonyms
- Turdus morio Linnaeus, 1766

= Red-winged starling =

Species of bird

The red-winged starling (Onychognathus morio) is a bird of the starling family Sturnidae native to eastern and southern Africa from Ethiopia to South Africa. An omnivorous, generalist species, it prefers cliffs and mountainous areas for nesting, and has moved into cities and towns due to similarity to its original habitat.

== Taxonomy ==
In 1760 the French zoologist Mathurin Jacques Brisson included a description of the red-winged starling in his Ornithologie based on a specimen collected from the Cape of Good Hope in South Africa. He used the French name Le merle du Cap de Bonne Espérance and the Latin Merula Capitis Bonae Spei. Although Brisson coined Latin names, these do not conform to the binomial system and are not recognised by the International Commission on Zoological Nomenclature. When in 1766 the Swedish naturalist Carl Linnaeus updated his Systema Naturae for the twelfth edition, he added 240 species that had been previously described by Brisson. One of these was the red-winged starling. Linnaeus included a brief description, coined the binomial name Turdus morio and cited Brisson's work. The specific name morio or morion is Latin for "dark brown stone" or "black quartz". This species is now placed in the genus Onychognathus that was introduced by the German physician and ornithologist Gustav Hartlaub in 1849.

Two subspecies are recognised:

- O. m. rueppellii (Verreaux, J, 1856) – south Sudan to central Ethiopia and north Kenya
- O. m. morio (Linnaeus, 1766) – Southern red-winged starling: Uganda and Kenya to Botswana and south South Africa

== Description ==
The male of this 27–30-centimetre (11–12 in) long starling has mainly iridescent black plumage, with chestnut flight feathers, which are particularly noticeable in flight. The female has an ash-grey head and upper breast. The juvenile resembles the male, but is less glossy than the adults, and has brown rather than dark red eyes. The Ethiopian subspecies O. m. rupellii is longer-tailed than the nominate form and intergrades with it.

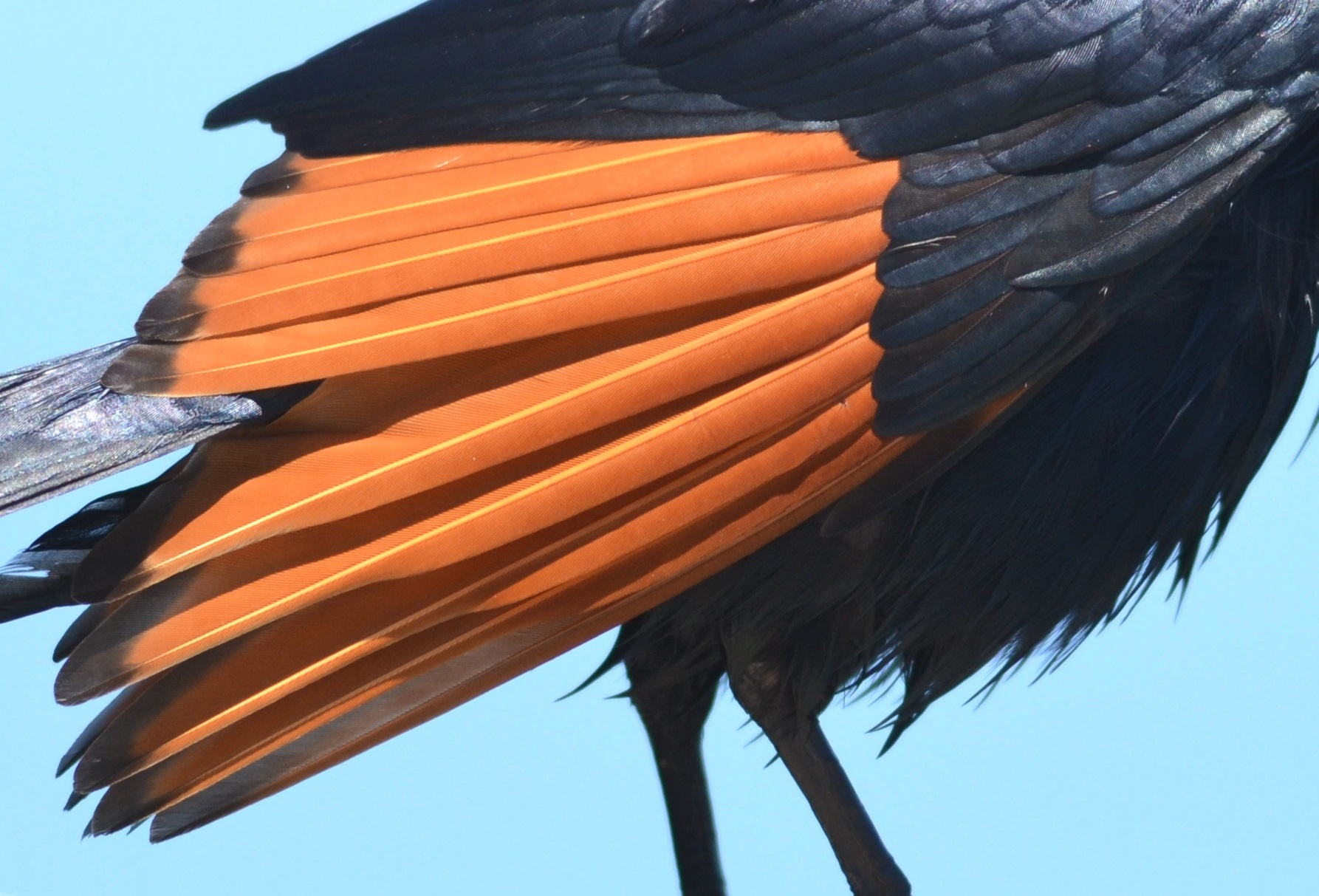
Exposed black-tipped, rufous primaries

This species has a number of whistled calls, but the most familiar is the contact call, cher-leeeoo.

This starling may be confused with other similar starling species, such as its sister species the pale-winged starling. The difference between the two is that the red-winged has rufous primaries while the pale-winged has whitish primaries edged with orange. The pale-winged has a bright red or orange eye, while the red-winged's is dark, almost black. Only the female of the red-winged has a grey head.

== Distribution and habitat ==
The range runs down eastern Africa from Ethiopia to the Cape, KwaZulu-Natal and Gauteng in South Africa. This species has a wide habitat tolerance. It may be found in forest, savannah, grassland, wetlands, fynbos, farmlands and commercial plantations, as well as urban centres. It is now common in many urban areas, due to the similarity between the structure of tall buildings and houses as nest sites with the cliffs of its original habitat. It may also nest in residential areas, breeding in roofs and apertures and up house eaves.

== Behaviour ==
=== Food and feeding ===
Like other starlings, the red-winged starling is an omnivore, taking a wide range of seeds, berries, nectar from plants such as Aloe and Schotia brachypetala, and invertebrates, such as the beetle species Pachnoda sinuata. They may take nestlings and adults of certain bird species, such as the African palm swift. It will also scavenge on carrion and human food scrap.

The red-winged starling will obviously only perch on plant structures that will be able to support its weight; therefore when taking nectar it will choose certain species with strong, robust racemes with easily accessible flowers, such as that of Aloe ferox and Aloe marlothii, and not Aloe arborescens. Large flowers that can support the bird's weight, such as that of Strelitzia nicolai and certain Protea species, are also chosen.

Fruit species that this species may feed on include figs, such as the sycamore fig and others, marulas, date palm fruit, berries from species such as wild olive Olea europaea subsp. cuspidata and Euphorbia, and commercial fruit such as apples, grapes, citruses and others.

In rural areas, red-winged starlings are often spotted perching on livestock and game, such as cattle, klipspringers and giraffes, a trait shared by the pale-winged starling, and may take insects and ectoparasites such as ticks, much in the manner of oxpeckers.

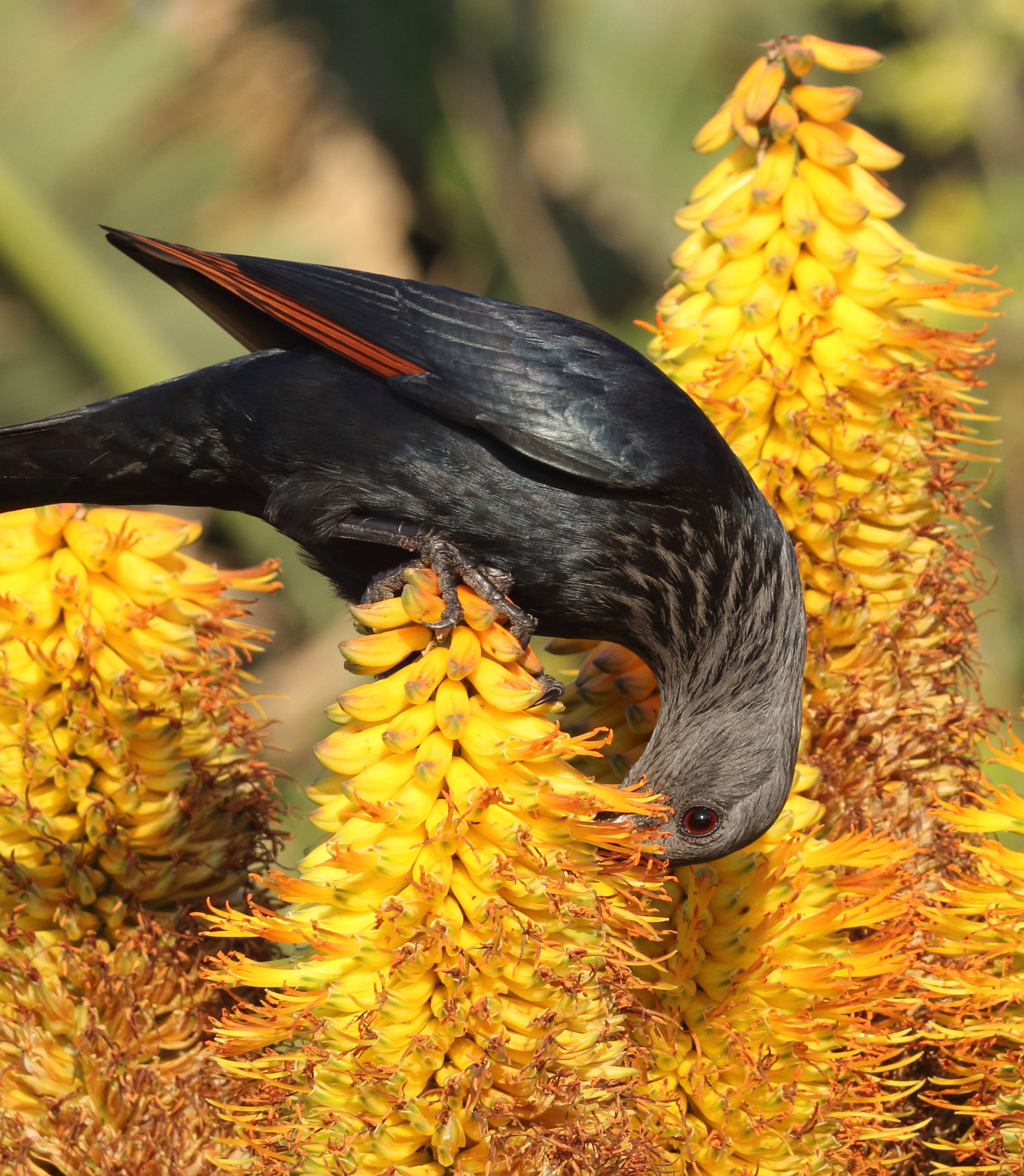
Female feeding on Aloe nectar

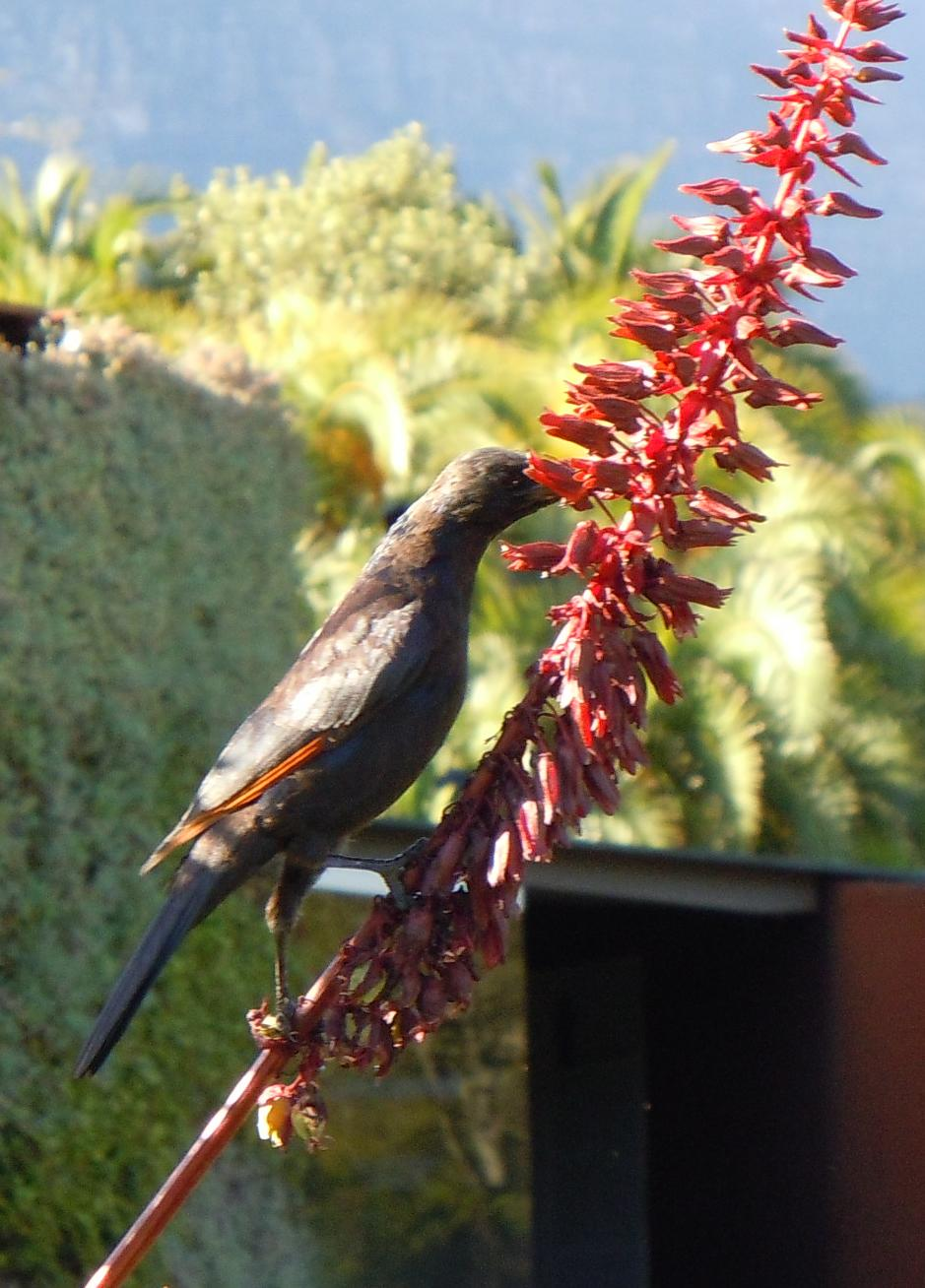
Male, feeding on a Melianthus inflorescence

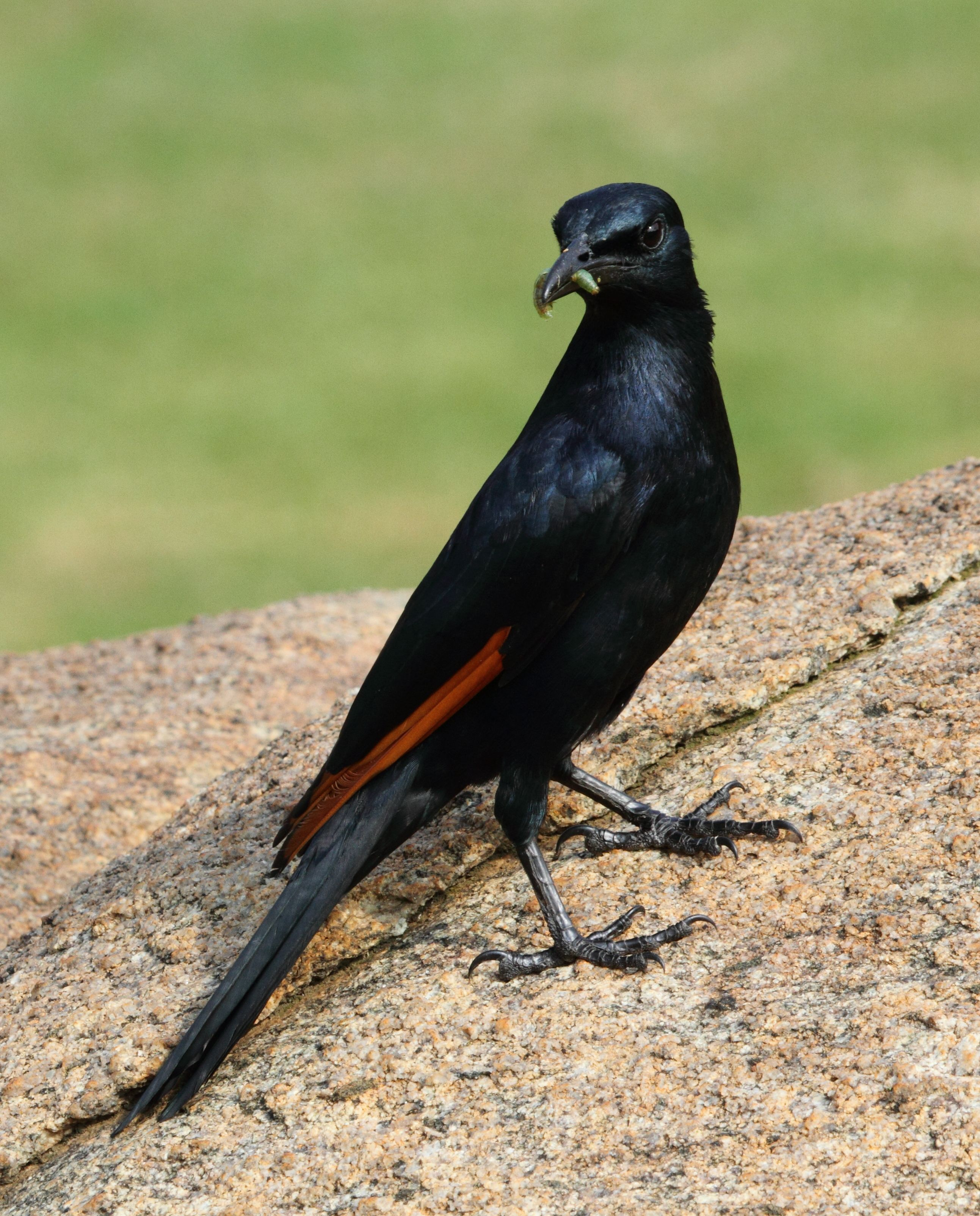
Male with caterpillar

=== Breeding ===
The red-winged starling is territorial, aggressive and intolerant when nesting, and will attack other species, including domestic animals and humans. When not breeding, red-winged starlings are highly gregarious and will associate with other members of their species in large flocks.

This starling is a cliff nester, breeding on rocky cliffs, outcrops and gorges. The red-winged starling builds a lined nest of grass and twigs, and with a mud base, on a natural or structural ledge. It lays two to four, usually three, blue eggs, spotted with red-brown. The female incubates the eggs for 13–14 days, with another 22–28 days to fledge. This starling is commonly double-brooded. It may be parasitised by the great spotted cuckoo.

== Predators ==
It is preyed upon by other birds such as peregrine falcons, lanner falcons, tawny eagles, cape eagle-owls, pied crows, and gymnogene.

== Status ==
The red-winged starling is not endangered and can be a pest in some areas, raiding orchards and attacking people that wander too close to their nests.

== Gallery ==
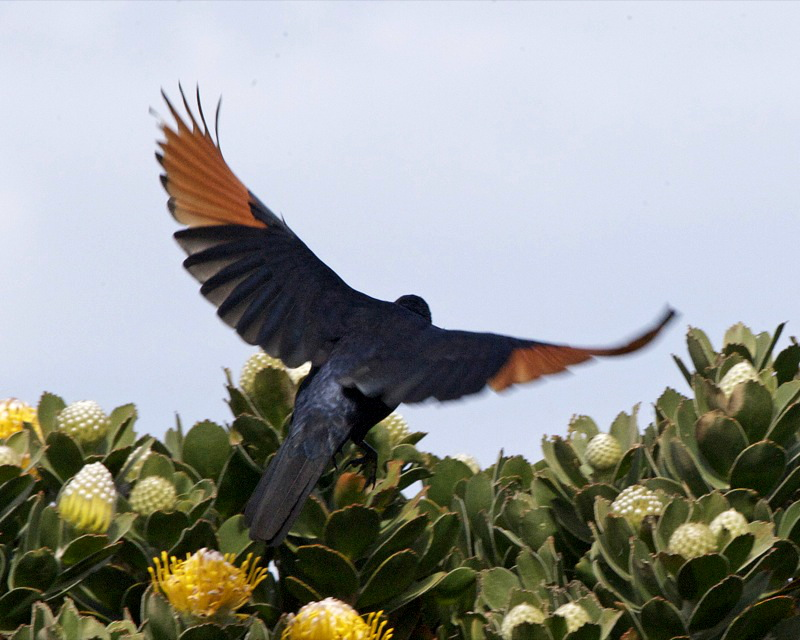
Chestnut-coloured primaries, a field mark which distinguishes it from O. nabouroup.

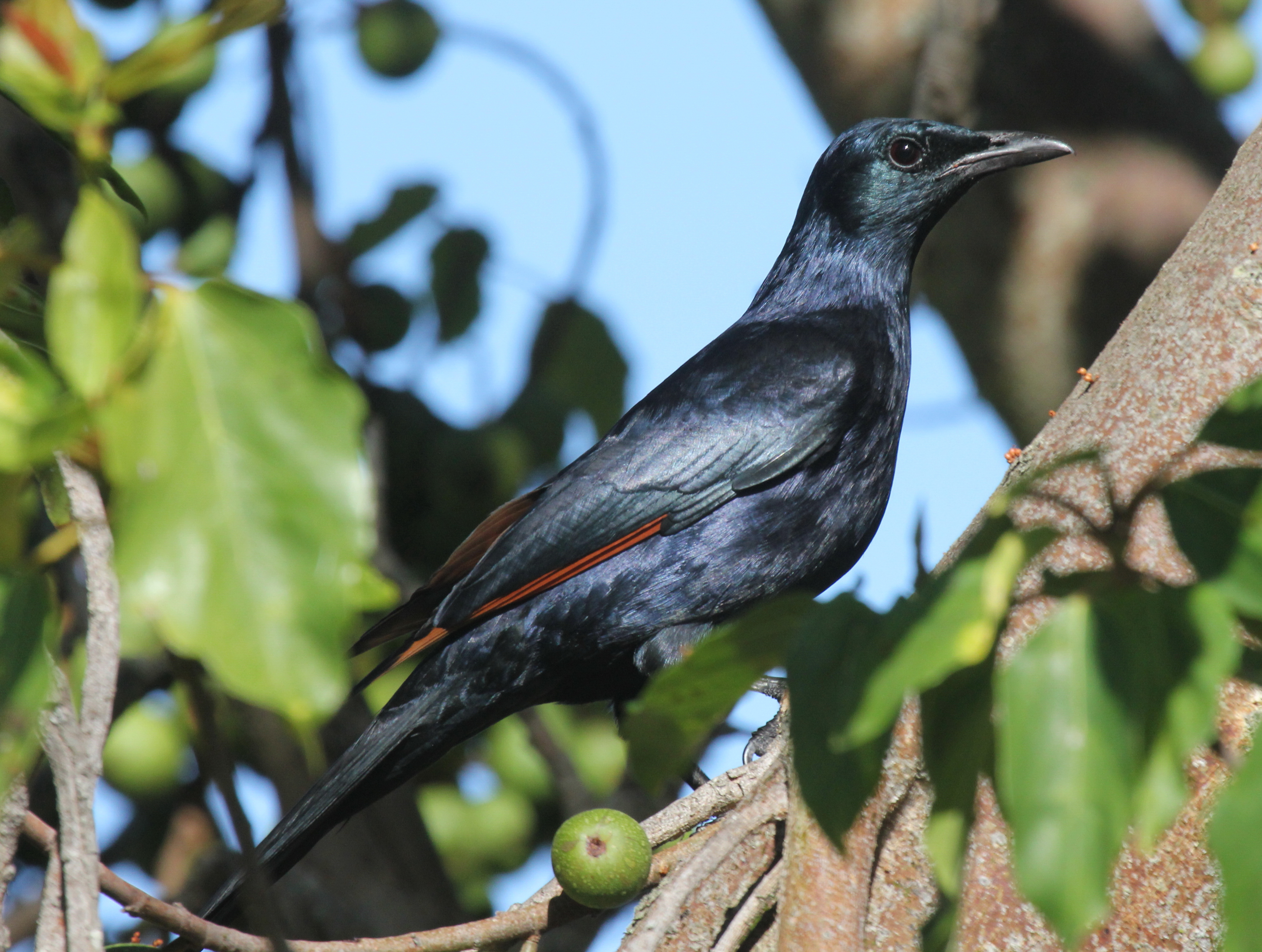
Male feeding in a Cape fig

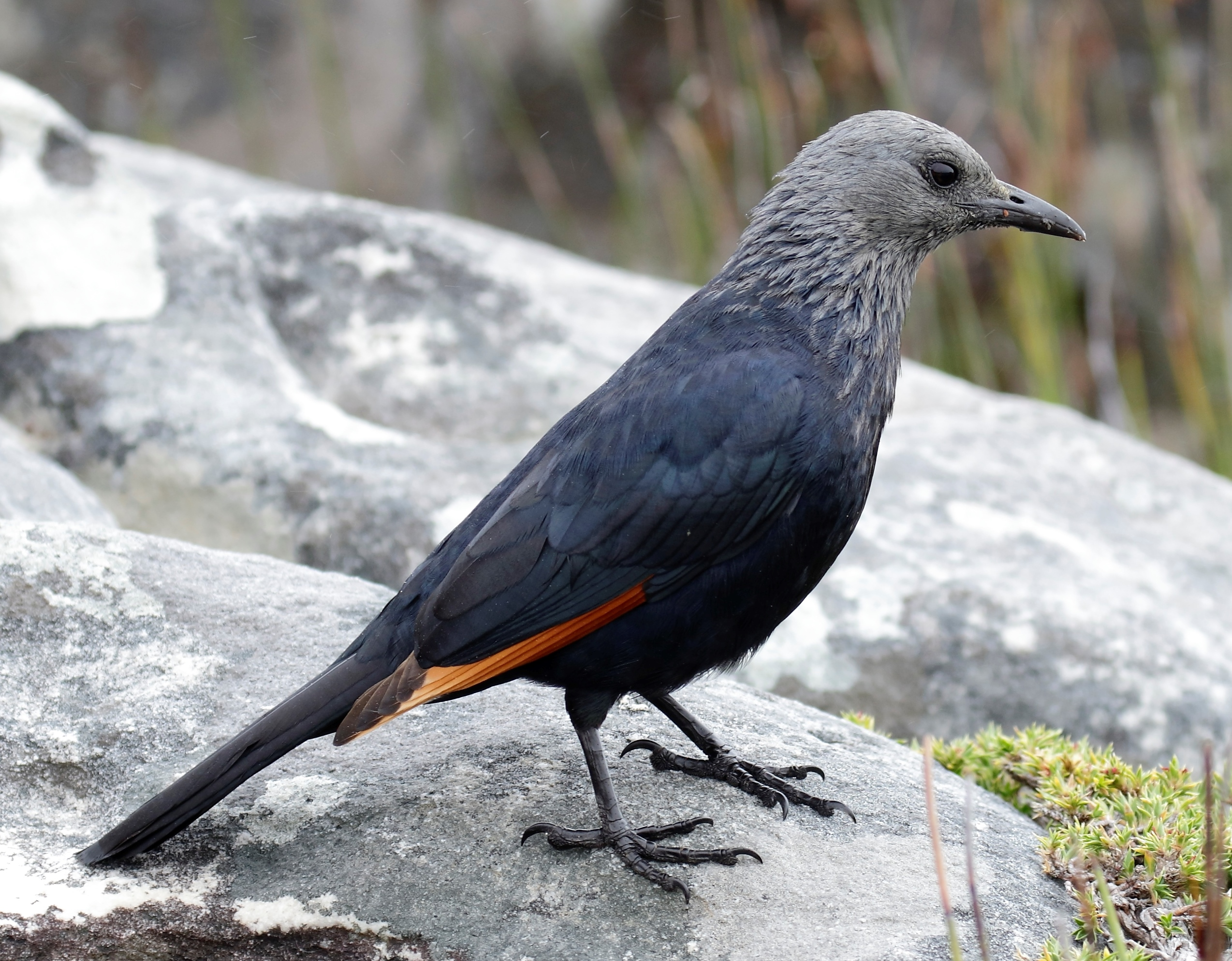
Female, showing streaky grey head plumage, in restio-dominated fynbos

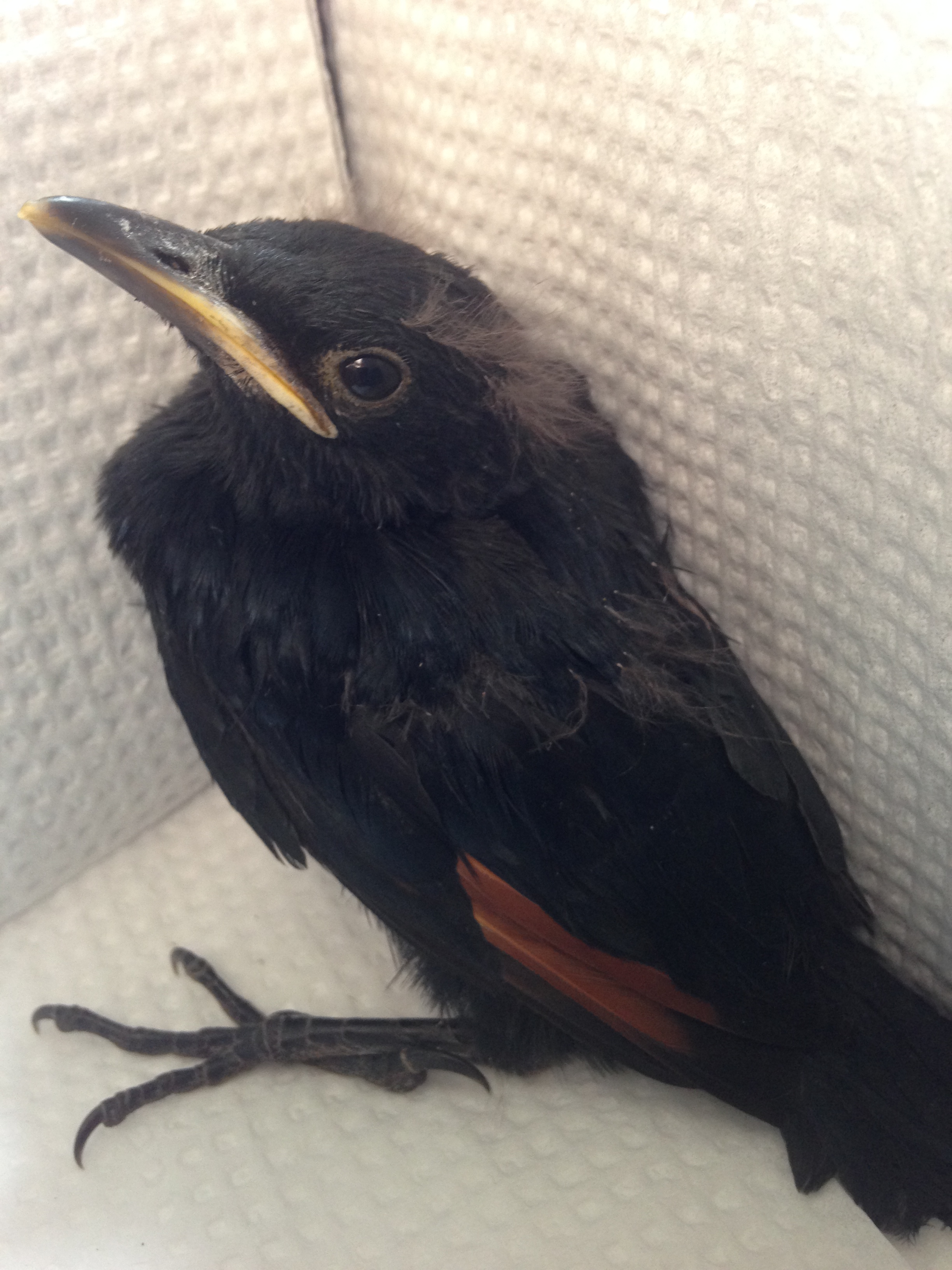
A chick that is almost ready to leave the nest.
