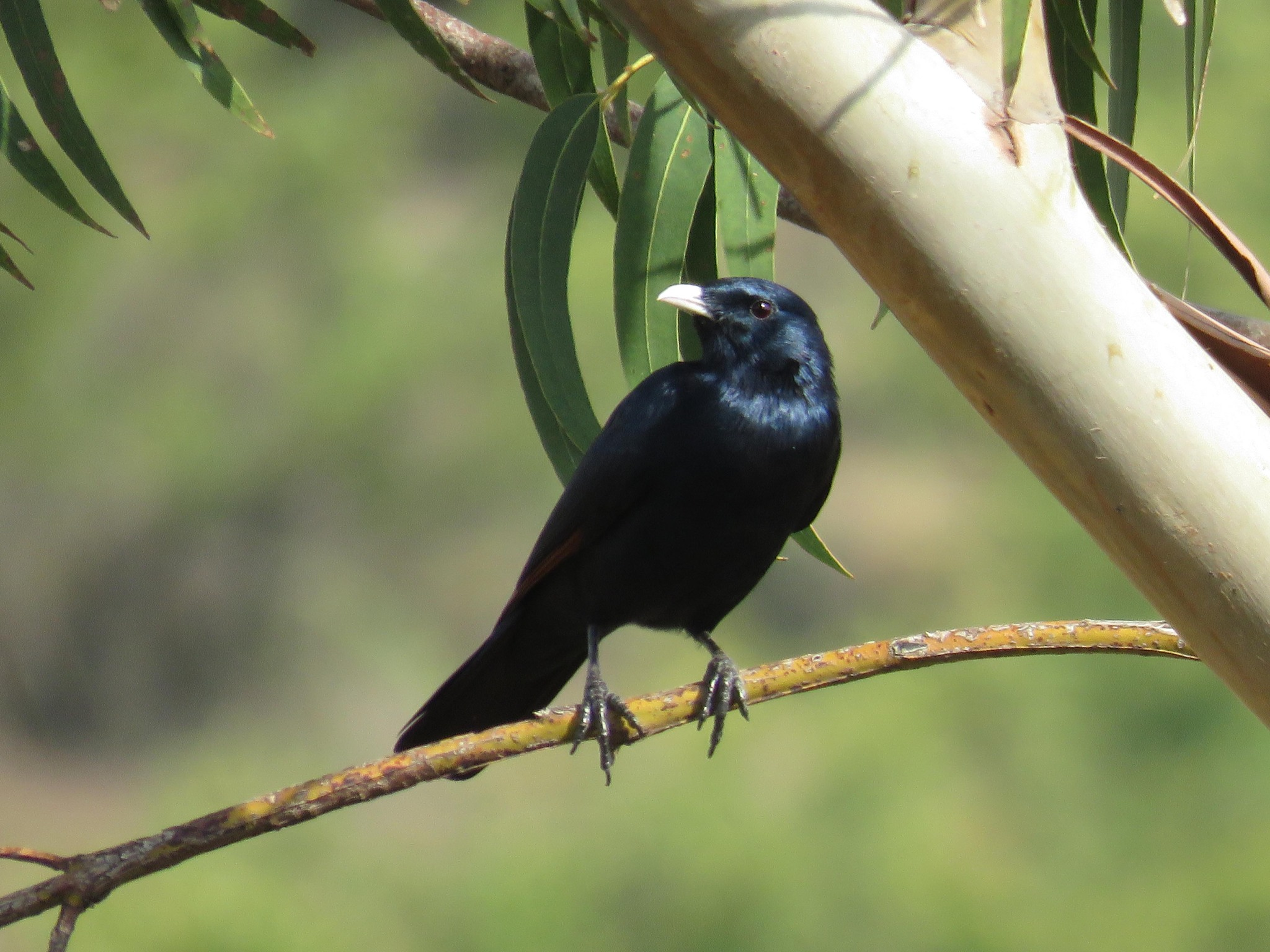

Conservation status
- Least Concern (IUCN 3.1)

Scientific classification
- Kingdom: Animalia
- Phylum: Chordata
- Class: Aves
- Order: Passeriformes
- Family: Sturnidae
- Genus: Onychognathus
- Species: O. albirostris

Binomial name
- Onychognathus albirostris (Rüppell, 1836)

= White-billed starling =

Species of bird

The white-billed starling (Onychognathus albirostris) is a species of starling in the family Sturnidae. It is found in Eritrea and Ethiopia.

== Habitat ==
In the Degua Tembien district it was found on steep cliffs.
