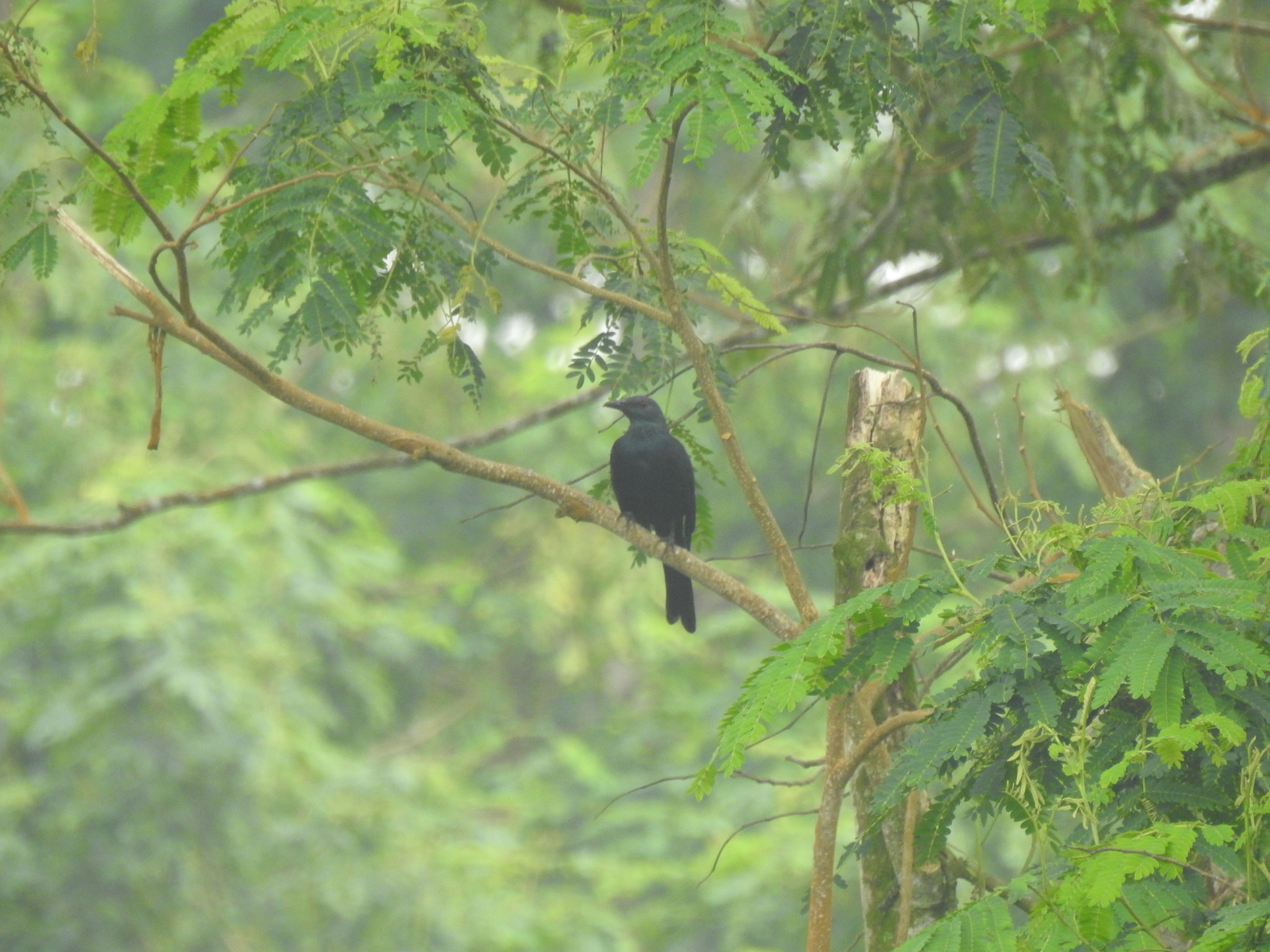

Conservation status
- Least Concern (IUCN 3.1)

Scientific classification
- Kingdom: Animalia
- Phylum: Chordata
- Class: Aves
- Order: Passeriformes
- Family: Sturnidae
- Genus: Onychognathus
- Species: O. fulgidus

Binomial name
- Onychognathus fulgidus Hartlaub, 1849

= Chestnut-winged starling =

Species of bird

The chestnut-winged starling (Onychognathus fulgidus) is a species of starling in the family Sturnidae. It is widespread throughout the African tropical rainforest.
