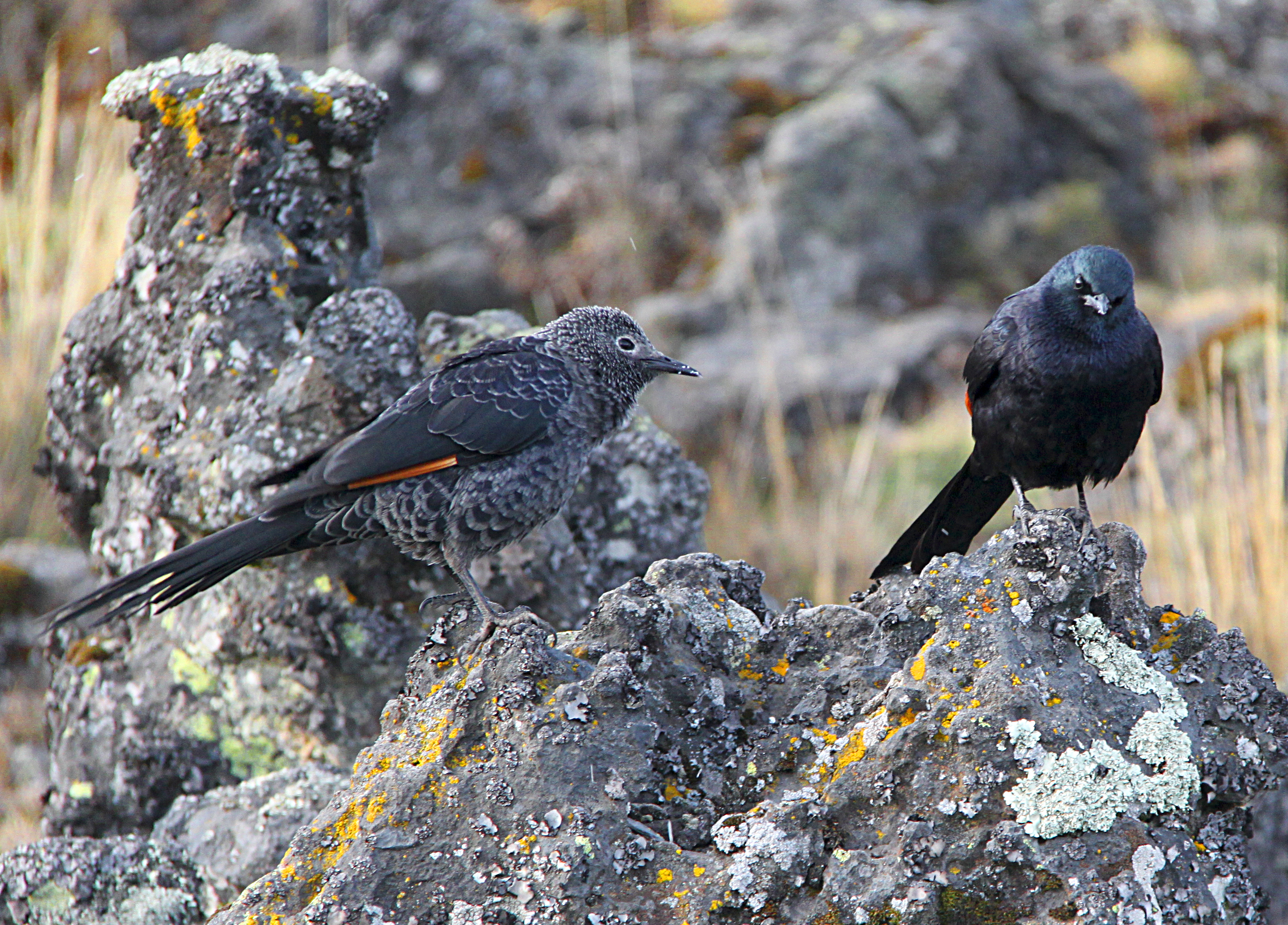
- Female (left) and male (right)

Conservation status
- Least Concern (IUCN 3.1)

Scientific classification
- Kingdom: Animalia
- Phylum: Chordata
- Class: Aves
- Order: Passeriformes
- Family: Sturnidae
- Genus: Onychognathus
- Species: O. tenuirostris

Binomial name
- Onychognathus tenuirostris (Rüppell, 1836)

Subspecies
- O. t. tenuirostris (Rüppell, 1836); O. t. theresae Meinertzhagen, 1937

Synonyms
- Lamprotornis tenuirostris Rüppell, 1836

= Slender-billed starling =

Species of bird

The slender-billed starling (Onychognathus tenuirostris) is a species of starling in the family Sturnidae. It is found in Burundi, Democratic Republic of the Congo, Eritrea, Ethiopia, Kenya, Malawi, Rwanda, Tanzania, Uganda, and Zambia.
