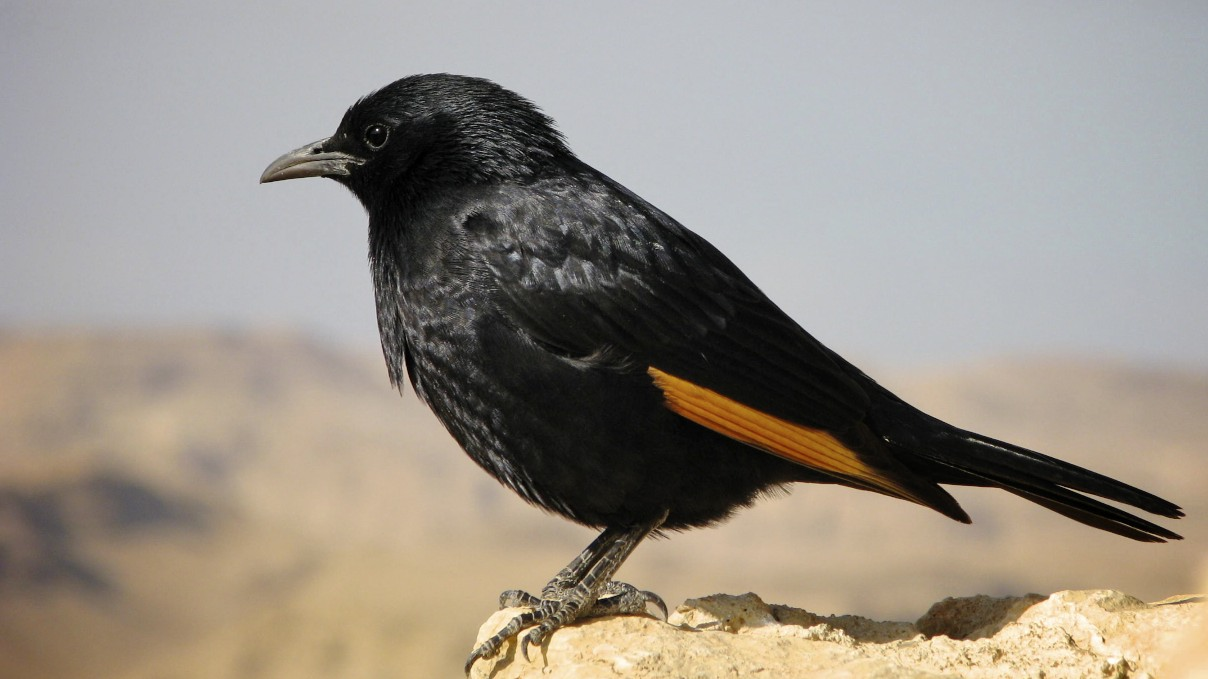
- At Masada, Israel

Conservation status
- Least Concern (IUCN 3.1)

Scientific classification
- Kingdom: Animalia
- Phylum: Chordata
- Class: Aves
- Order: Passeriformes
- Family: Sturnidae
- Genus: Onychognathus
- Species: O. tristramii

Binomial name
- Onychognathus tristramii (Sclater, PL, 1858)

= Tristram's starling =

Species of bird

Tristram's starling calls

Tristram's starling (Onychognathus tristramii), also known as Dead Sea starling or Tristram's grackle, is a species of starling native to the Middle East. It is the only member of the genus Onychognathus found mainly outside of Africa. The species is named after Reverend Henry Baker Tristram, who collected natural history specimens.

== Distribution and habitat ==
This bird is found in deserts in Israel, Palestine, Jordan, northeastern Egypt (Sinai Peninsula), (NEOM) ([Magna]), western Saudi Arabia, Yemen, and Oman, nesting mainly on rocky cliff faces. The species is becoming increasingly commensal with humans, feeding in towns and villages; this has enabled a recent northward spread in its distribution.

== Description ==
Tristram's starling is 25 cm long (including a 9 cm tail), with a wingspan of 44–45 cm, and a weight of 100–140 g. The males have glossy iridescent black plumage with orange patches on the outer wing, which are particularly noticeable in flight. The bill and legs are black. Females and young birds are similar but duller and with a greyish head, lacking the plumage gloss.

== Physiology ==
Although starlings are a tropical family by origin, Tristram's starling is well adapted to living in a desert environment: it loses relatively little water to evaporation and produces less heat than expected for its base metabolic rate. Its dark plumage may help it survive in the desert winter, when temperatures are low but the Sun's radiation is strong.

== Ecology and behavior ==
=== Diet ===
Tristram's starlings are omnivorous, feeding on fruit and invertebrates (mainly insects such as beetles, flies, butterflies, and bees; but also small snails). They have also been observed grooming Nubian ibex and domestic livestock for parasites. Although they do not migrate for the most part, they fly relatively long distances compared to other resident birds, which likely makes them important seed dispersers for fleshy-fruited desert plants. In addition, they often forage for scraps in human settlements.

=== Breeding ===
Tristram's starlings breed during the spring and early summer. They nest in existing cavities in rocky cliffs and also in urban buildings. Pairs are monogamous. The male courts the female by bringing her insects and twigs. They lay 2-4 eggs, which are blue with brown spots. Females incubate alone, but both parents feed the chicks. The young leave the nest about a month after hatching. Some pairs raise a second brood in later in the season, using the same nest.

=== Social behaviour ===
Tristram's starling is a gregarious and noisy bird, with a call that resembles a wolf whistle. Outside the breeding season the starlings live in groups of between ten and a few hundred individuals. However, pairs remain together throughout the year, even when they join a larger group.

== Gallery ==
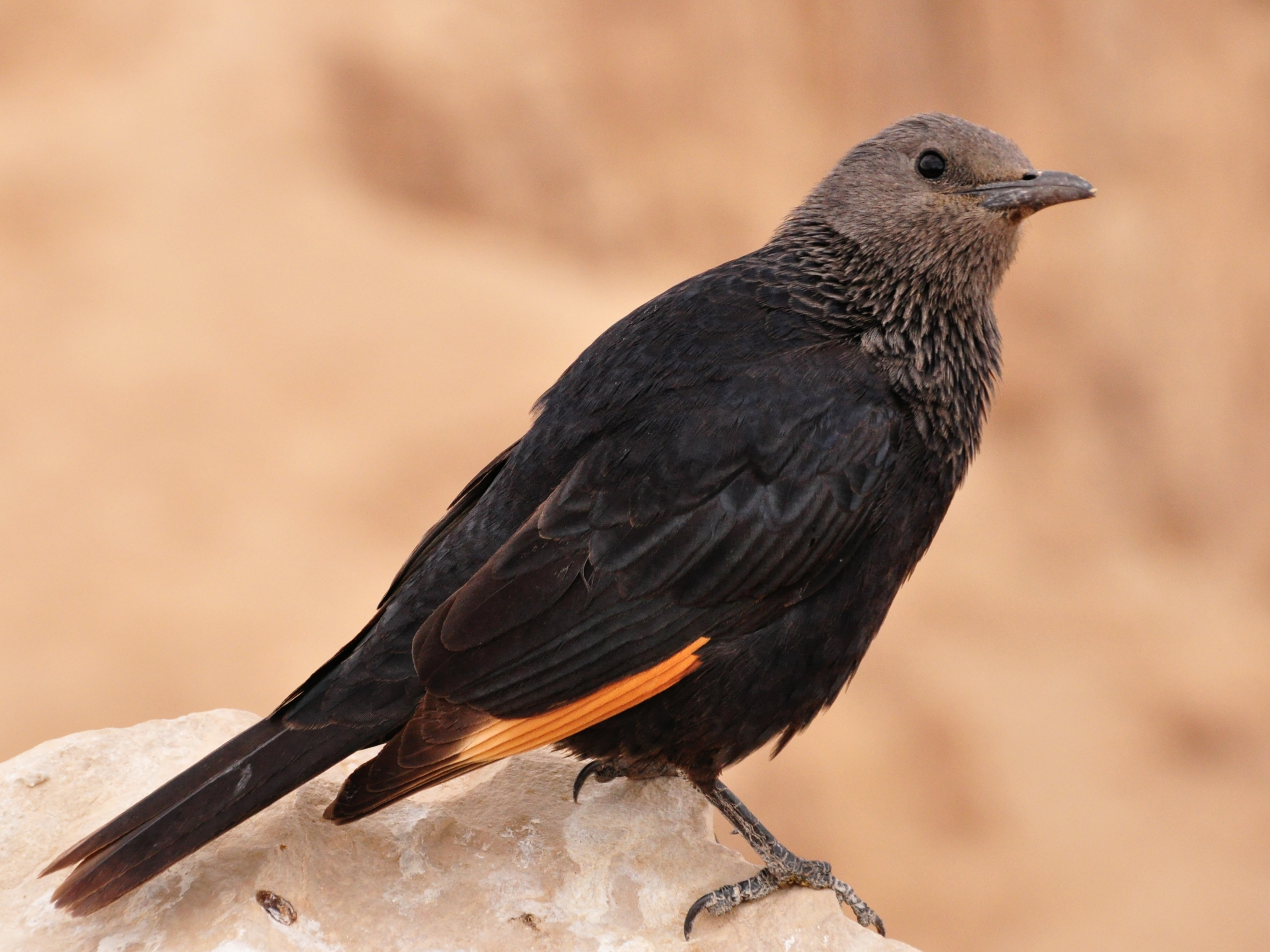
Female in Israel

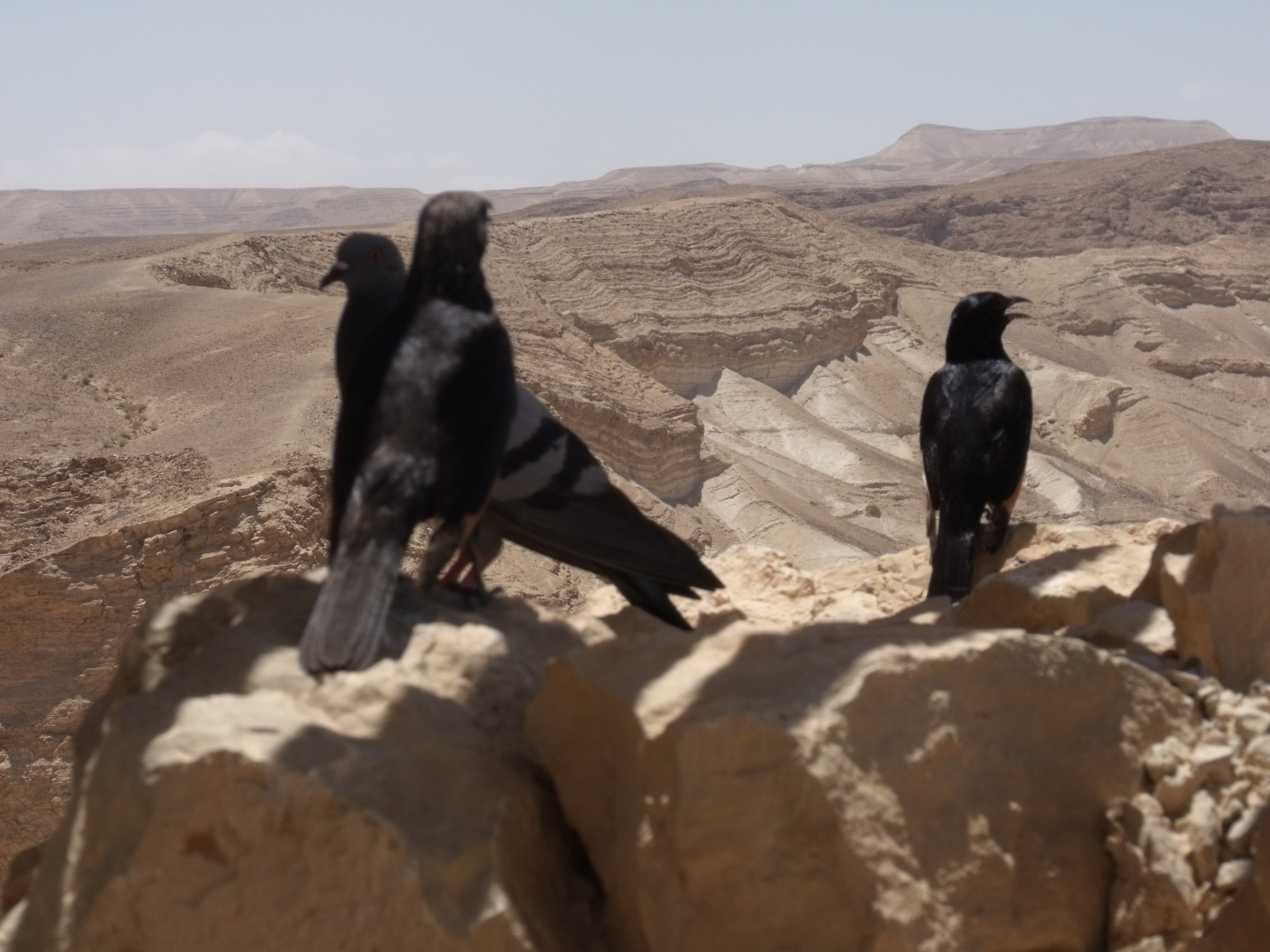
A group in Masada, Israel

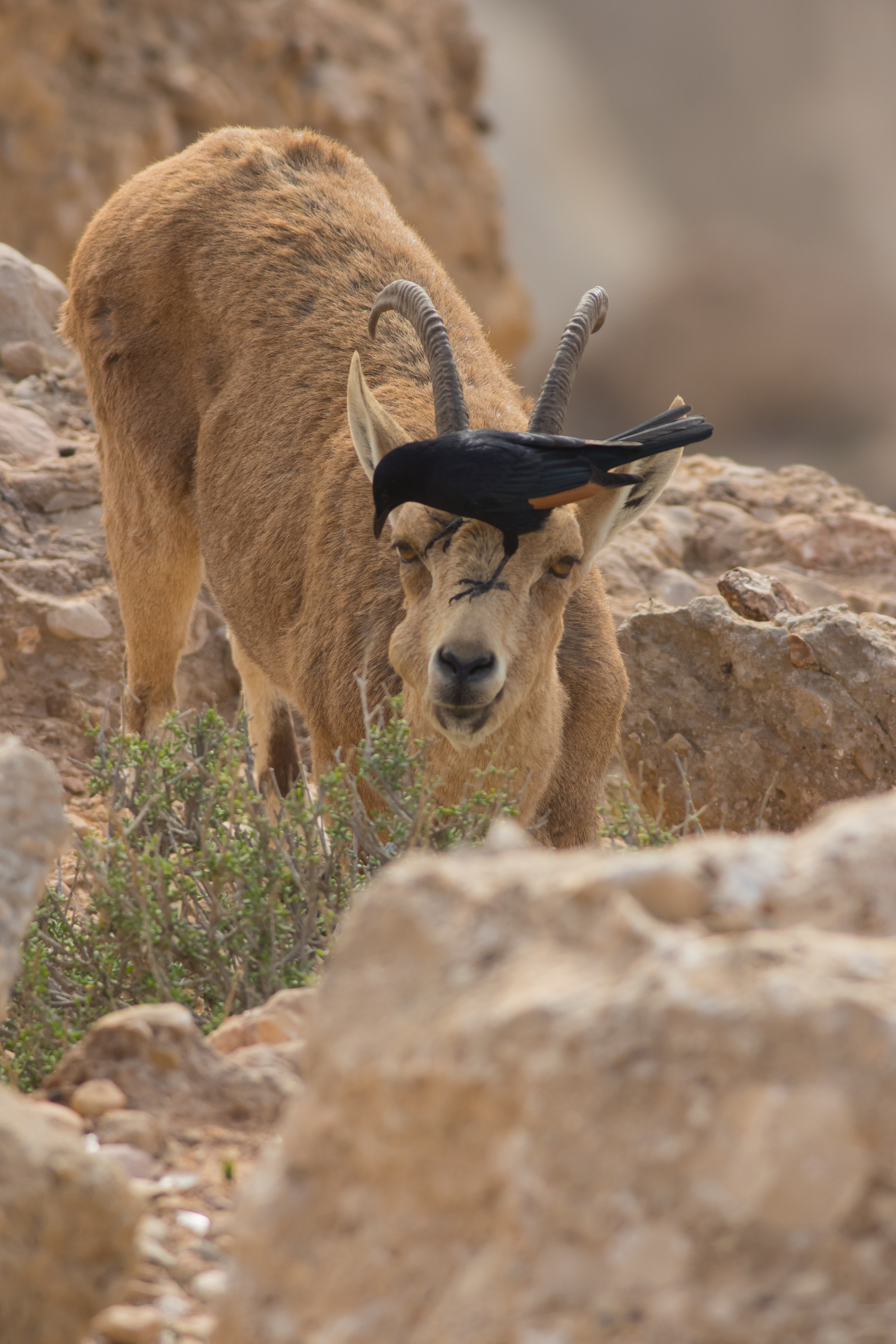
Tristram's starling on a Nubian ibex in Sde Boker, Israel

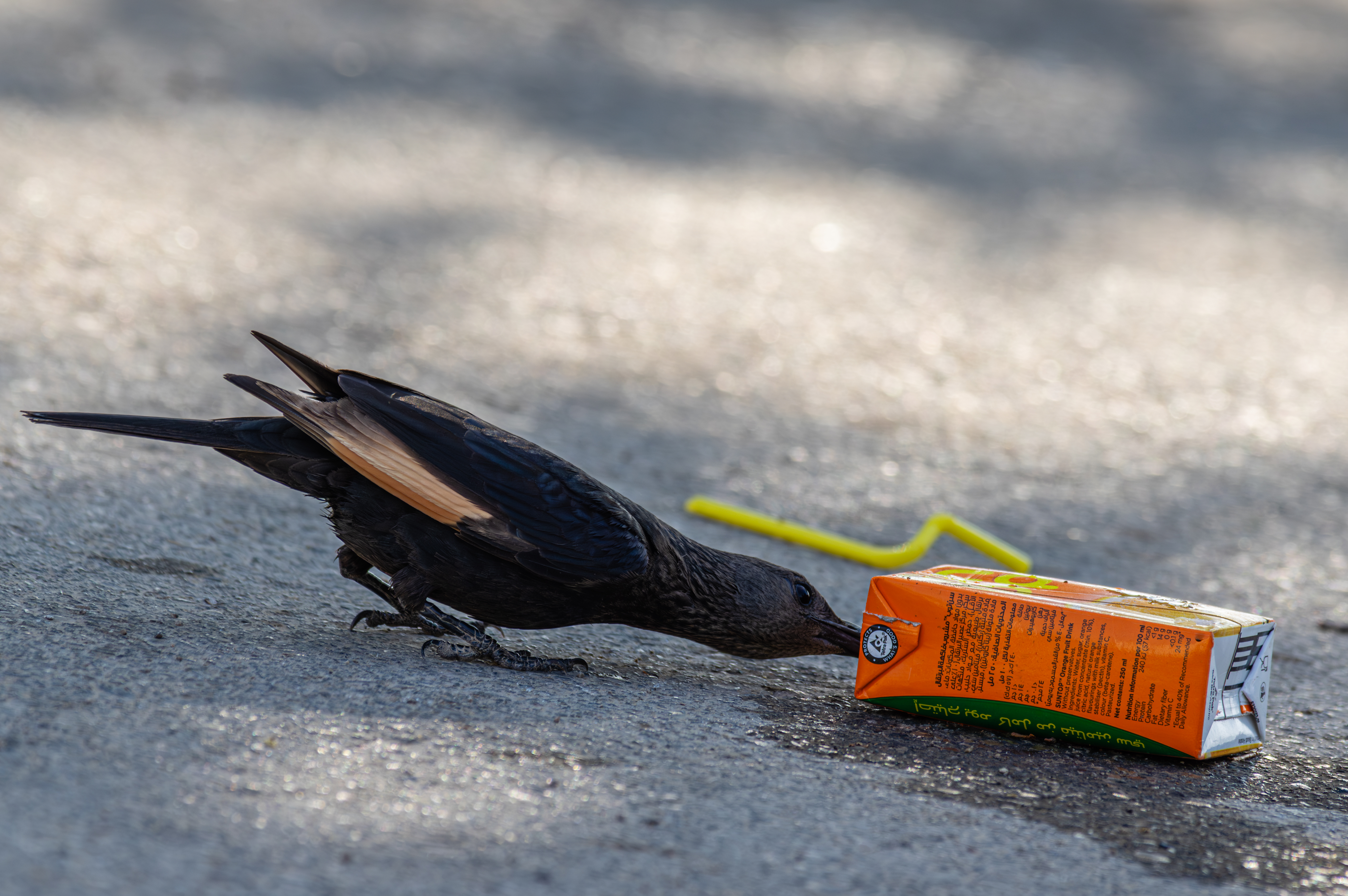
Oman

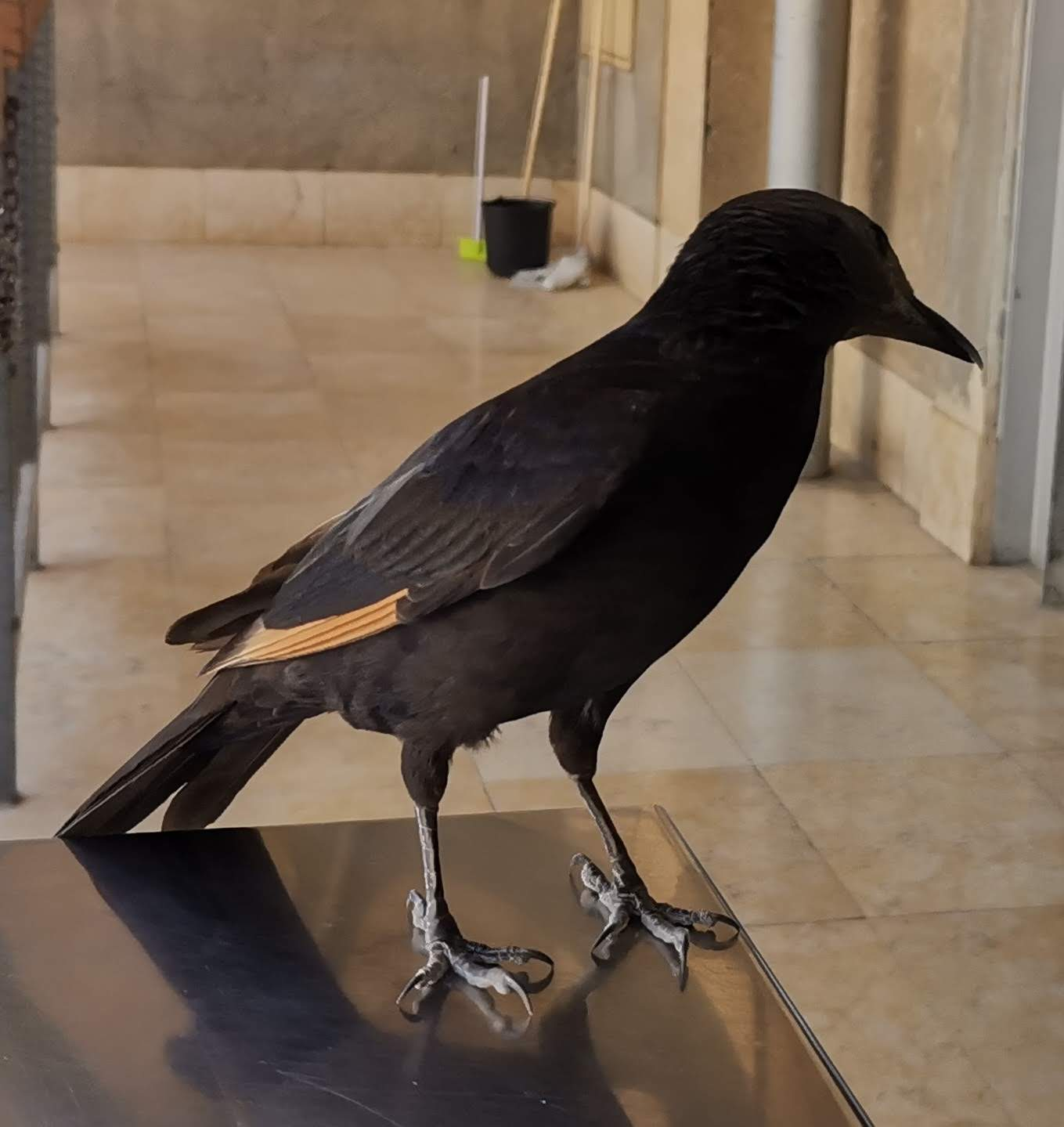
A Tristram's starling, near Masada
