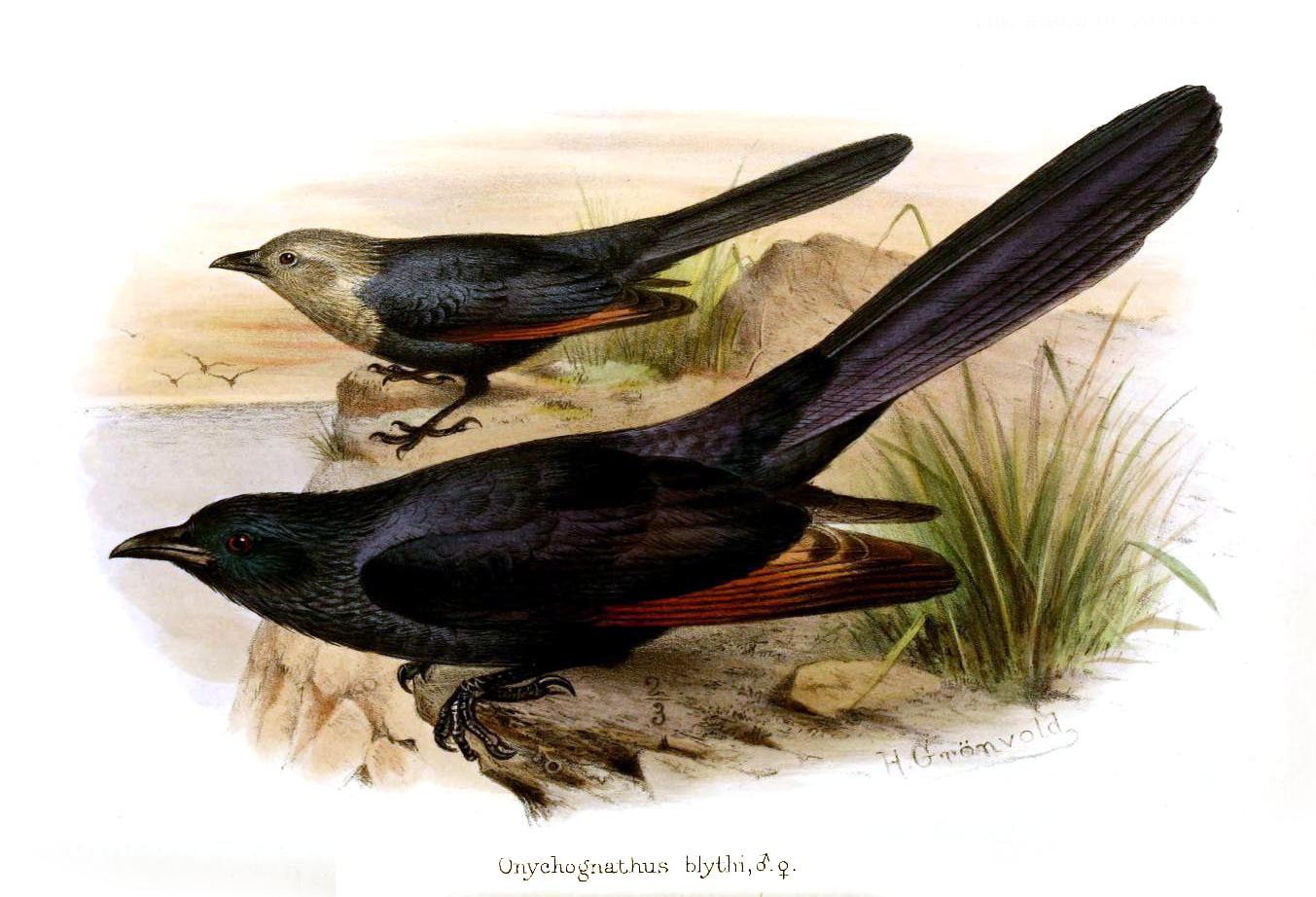

Conservation status
- Least Concern (IUCN 3.1)

Scientific classification
- Kingdom: Animalia
- Phylum: Chordata
- Class: Aves
- Order: Passeriformes
- Family: Sturnidae
- Genus: Onychognathus
- Species: O. blythii

Binomial name
- Onychognathus blythii (Hartlaub, 1859)

Synonyms
- Amydrus blythii protonym

= Somali starling =

Species of bird

The Somali starling (Onychognathus blythii) is a species of starling in the family Sturnidae. It is found in Djibouti, Eritrea, Ethiopia, Somalia and Socotra.

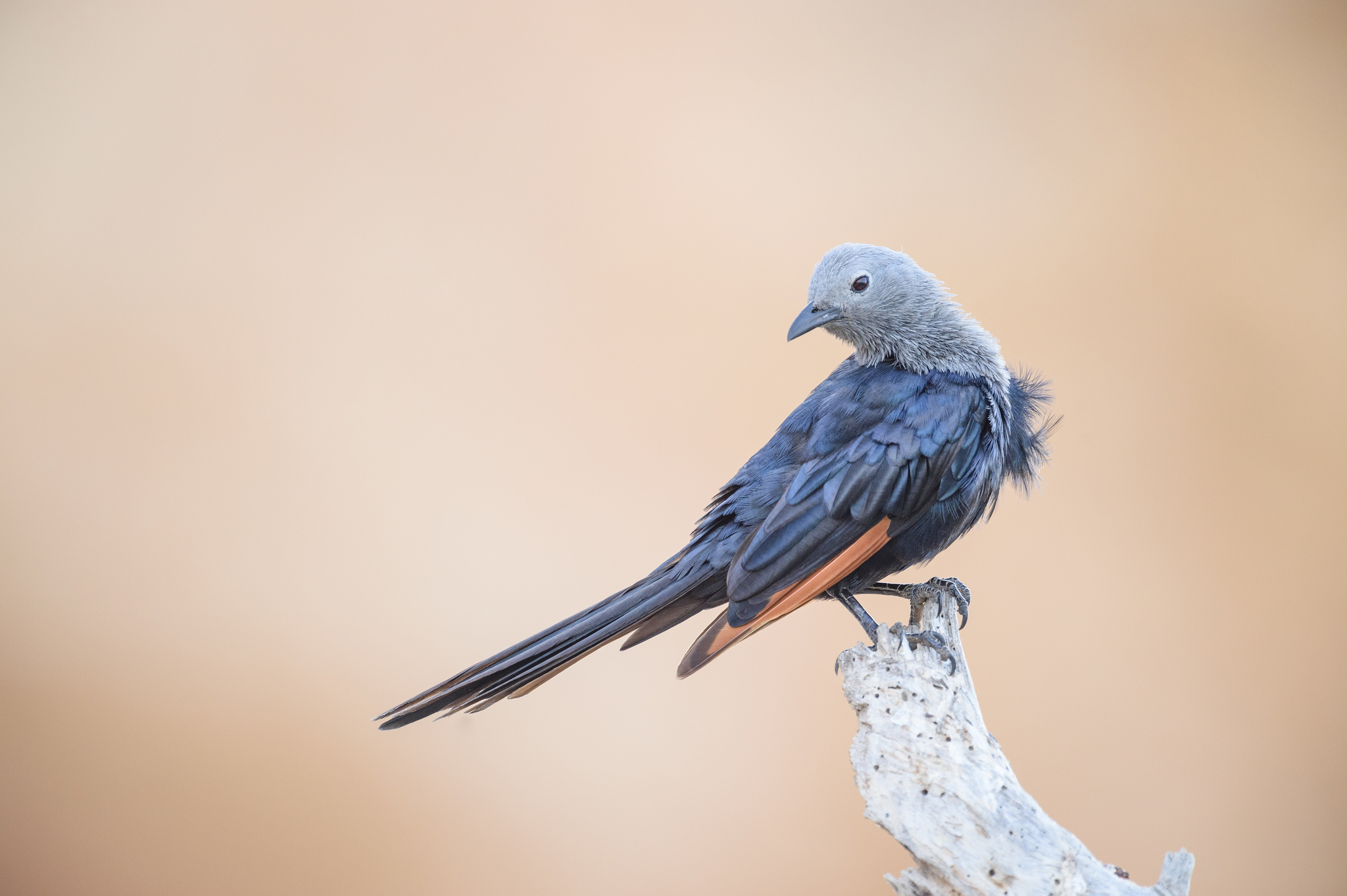
female bird

== Habitat ==
In the Degua Tembien district of north Ethiopia, the species can be observed in bushy and shrubby areas.
