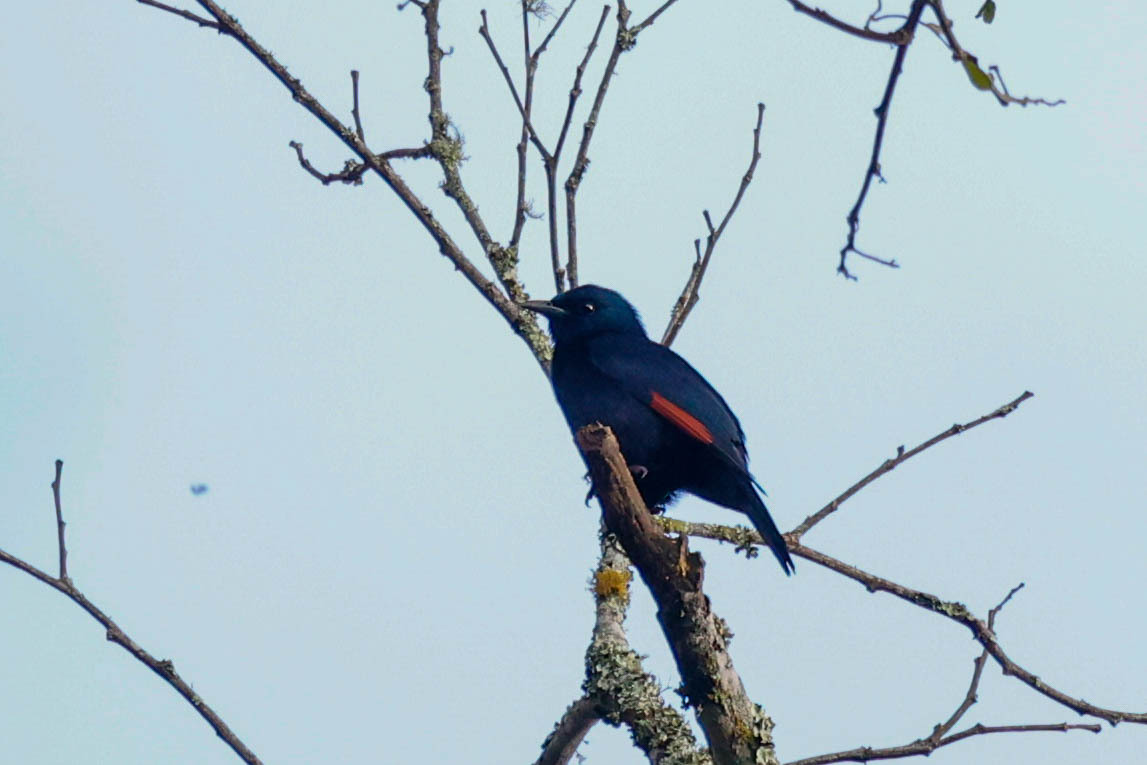

Conservation status
- Least Concern (IUCN 3.1)

Scientific classification
- Kingdom: Animalia
- Phylum: Chordata
- Class: Aves
- Order: Passeriformes
- Family: Sturnidae
- Genus: Onychognathus
- Species: O. walleri

Binomial name
- Onychognathus walleri (Shelley, 1880)

= Waller's starling =

Species of bird

Waller's starling (Onychognathus walleri) is a species of starling in the family Sturnidae.

It is native to the Western High Plateau and Bioko, the Albertine Rift montane forests, the East African montane forests and the Eastern Arc forests.

The common name and scientific name commemorates the English naturalist Gerald Waller.
