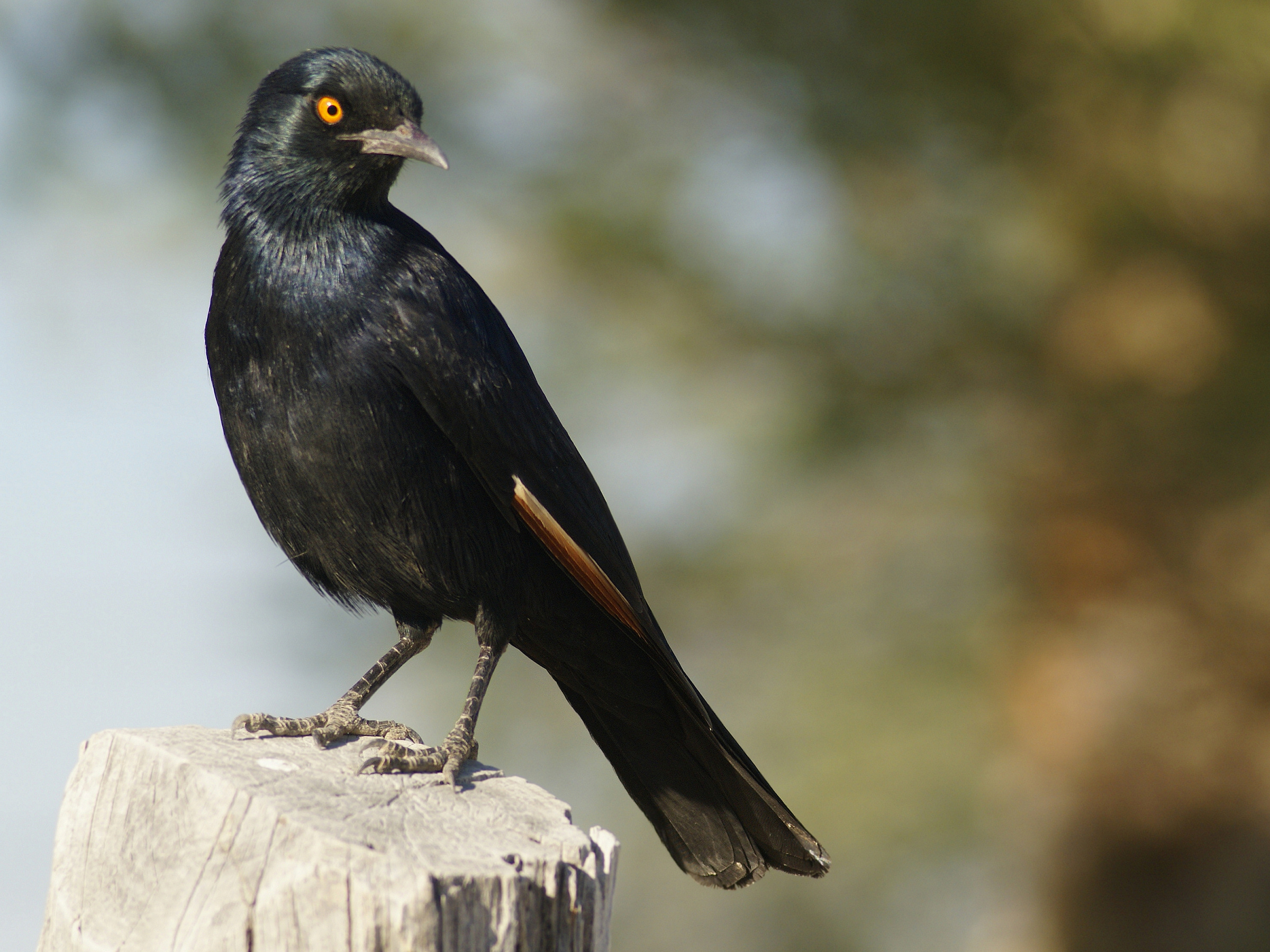
- Pale-winged starling (Onychognathus nabouroup)

Scientific classification
- Kingdom: Animalia
- Phylum: Chordata
- Class: Aves
- Order: Passeriformes
- Family: Sturnidae
- Genus: Onychognathus; Hartlaub, 1849

Type species
- Onychognathus fulgidus Hartlaub, 1849

= Onychognathus =

Genus of birds

Onychognathus is a genus of starlings native to the Afrotropical realm. All the species are quite similar, and characterised by rufous primary wing feathers, very obvious in flight. The males are typically mainly glossy black, and the females have dull (sometimes dark, depending on species) grey heads.

== Taxonomy ==
The genus was introduced by the German physician and ornithologist Gustav Hartlaub in 1849 to accommodate a single species, Onychognathus fulgidus Hartlaub, the chestnut-winged starling, which becomes the type species. The name Onychognathus combines the Ancient Greek words onukhos "claw" or "nail" and gnathos "jaw".

The genus contains the following 11 species.

Image	Common name	Scientific name	Distribution
	Red-winged starling	Onychognathus morio	East, southeast, south Africa
	Slender-billed starling	Onychognathus tenuirostris	East Africa
	Chestnut-winged starling	Onychognathus fulgidus	West, central Africa
	Waller's starling	Onychognathus walleri	Central west, central, east Africa
	Somali starling	Onychognathus blythii	Eritrea, Ethiopia, Djibouti, Somalia and Socotra
	Socotra starling	Onychognathus frater	Socotra
	Tristram's starling	Onychognathus tristramii	Arabian Peninsula
	Pale-winged starling	Onychognathus nabouroup	Southwest Angola to south and central South Africa
	Bristle-crowned starling	Onychognathus salvadorii	Central Ethiopia to northeast Uganda, central Kenya and central Somalia
	White-billed starling	Onychognathus albirostris	Montane Eritrea and Ethiopia
	Neumann's starling	Onychognathus neumanni	Central, west Africa
