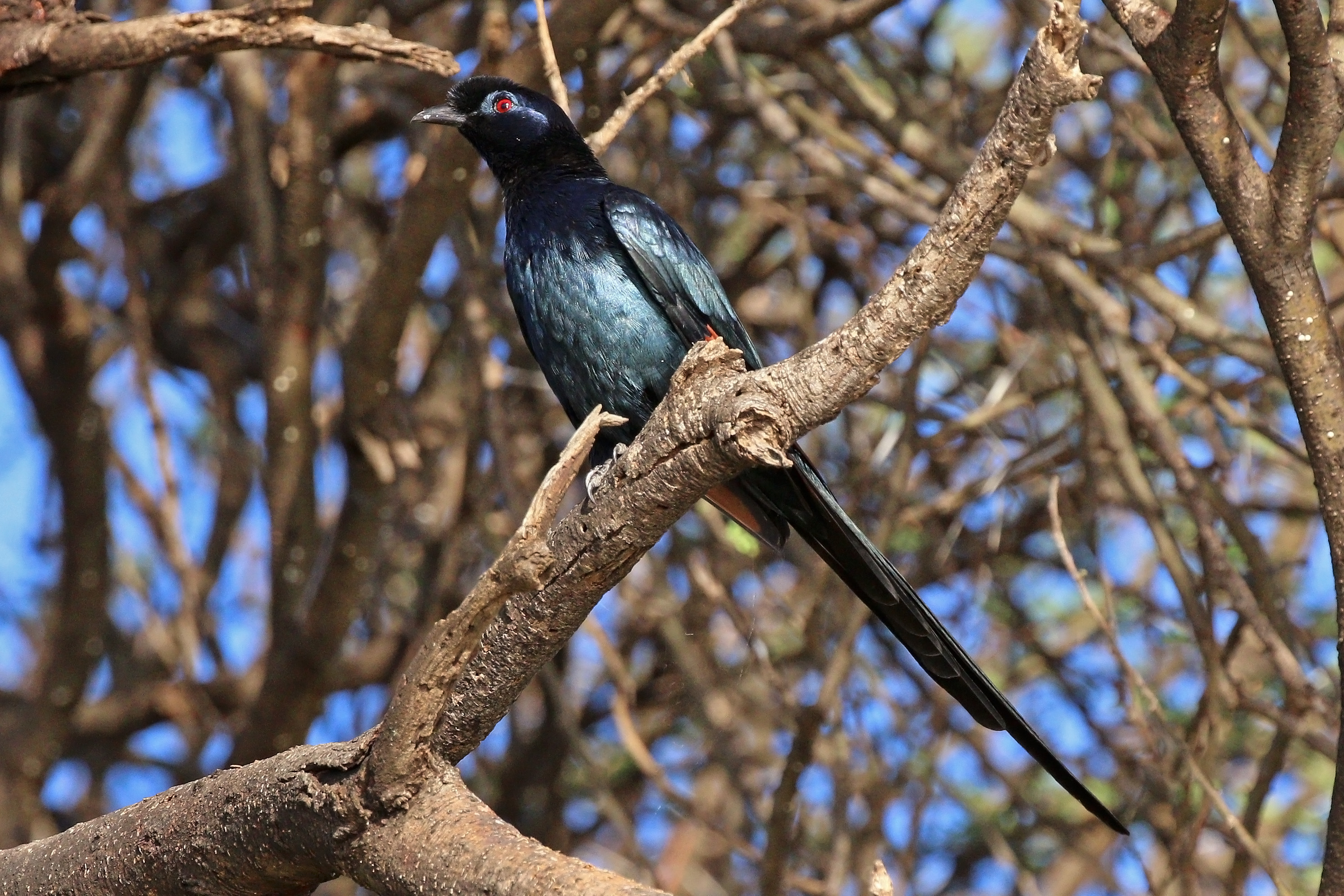
- Lake Baringo, Kenya

Conservation status
- Least Concern (IUCN 3.1)

Scientific classification
- Kingdom: Animalia
- Phylum: Chordata
- Class: Aves
- Order: Passeriformes
- Family: Sturnidae
- Genus: Onychognathus
- Species: O. salvadorii

Binomial name
- Onychognathus salvadorii (Sharpe, 1891)

= Bristle-crowned starling =

Species of bird

The bristle-crowned starling (Onychognathus salvadorii) is a species of starling in the family Sturnidae. It is found in Ethiopia, Kenya, Somalia, and Uganda.
