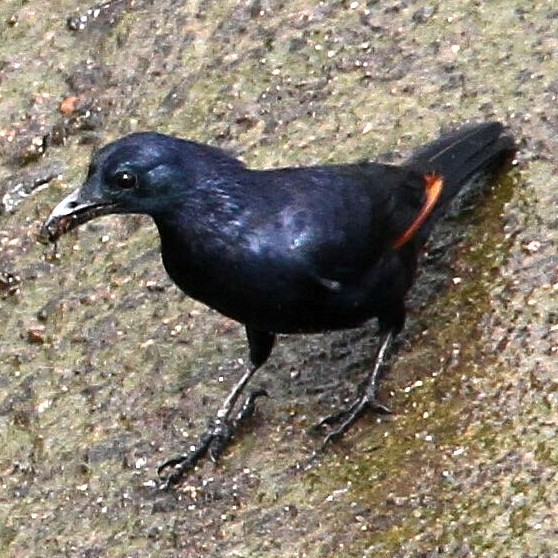

Conservation status
- Least Concern (IUCN 3.1)

Scientific classification
- Kingdom: Animalia
- Phylum: Chordata
- Class: Aves
- Order: Passeriformes
- Family: Sturnidae
- Genus: Onychognathus
- Species: O. neumanni

Binomial name
- Onychognathus neumanni (Alexander, 1908)

= Neumann's starling =

Species of bird

Neumann's starling (Onychognathus neumanni) or Neumann's red-winged starling, is a bird native to Africa. This starling breeds on rocky cliffs, outcrops and gorges mainly in the Sahel from Mauritania and Guinea to western Sudan. Its English and binomial names commemorate German ornithologist Oscar Rudolph Neumann.

== Description ==
This 25 cm long species is similar to other Onychognathus starlings, showing the characteristic rufous primary wing feathers, very obvious in flight. The iris is dark red, and the bill and legs are black. The male plumage is otherwise mainly glossy black, and the female is ash grey with darker streaking. The juvenile resembles the male, but is less glossy than the adult, and has brown rather than dark red eyes.

The song is a too-whee-oo, and the alarm call is a harsh air, air.

Western populations from western Mali and the Ivory Coast are smaller and shorter-tailed than the nominate form, O. n. neumanni, and are assigned to the subspecies O. n. modicus.

== Behaviour ==
The red-winged starling builds a nest of grass on a ledge in a sheltered site such as a cave. It is also associated with human settlement, and some related red-winged starling species are known to use man-made structures as nest sites.

This species is territorial, aggressive and intolerant when nesting, and will attack other species, including birds of prey.

Like other starlings, the Neumann's red-winged starling is an omnivore, taking a wide range of fruit, including figs, and some invertebrates. It is highly gregarious, and will form large flocks when not breeding.
