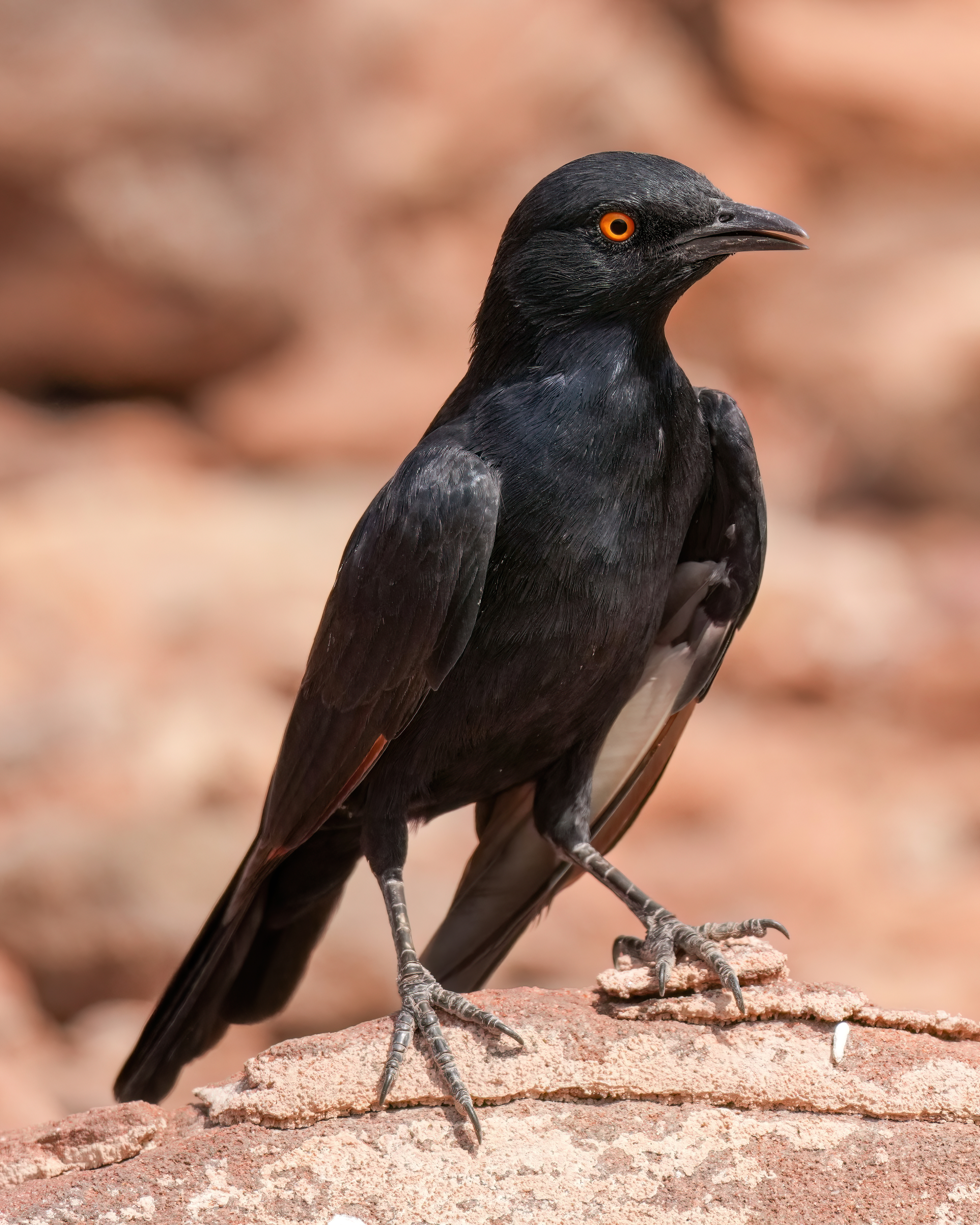
- Twyfelfontein, Namibia

Conservation status
- Least Concern (IUCN 3.1)

Scientific classification
- Kingdom: Animalia
- Phylum: Chordata
- Class: Aves
- Order: Passeriformes
- Family: Sturnidae
- Genus: Onychognathus
- Species: O. nabouroup

Binomial name
- Onychognathus nabouroup (Daudin, 1800)

= Pale-winged starling =

Species of bird

The pale-winged starling (Onychognathus nabouroup) is a species of starling in the family Sturnidae. It is found in Angola, Botswana, Namibia, and South Africa.

== Habitat ==
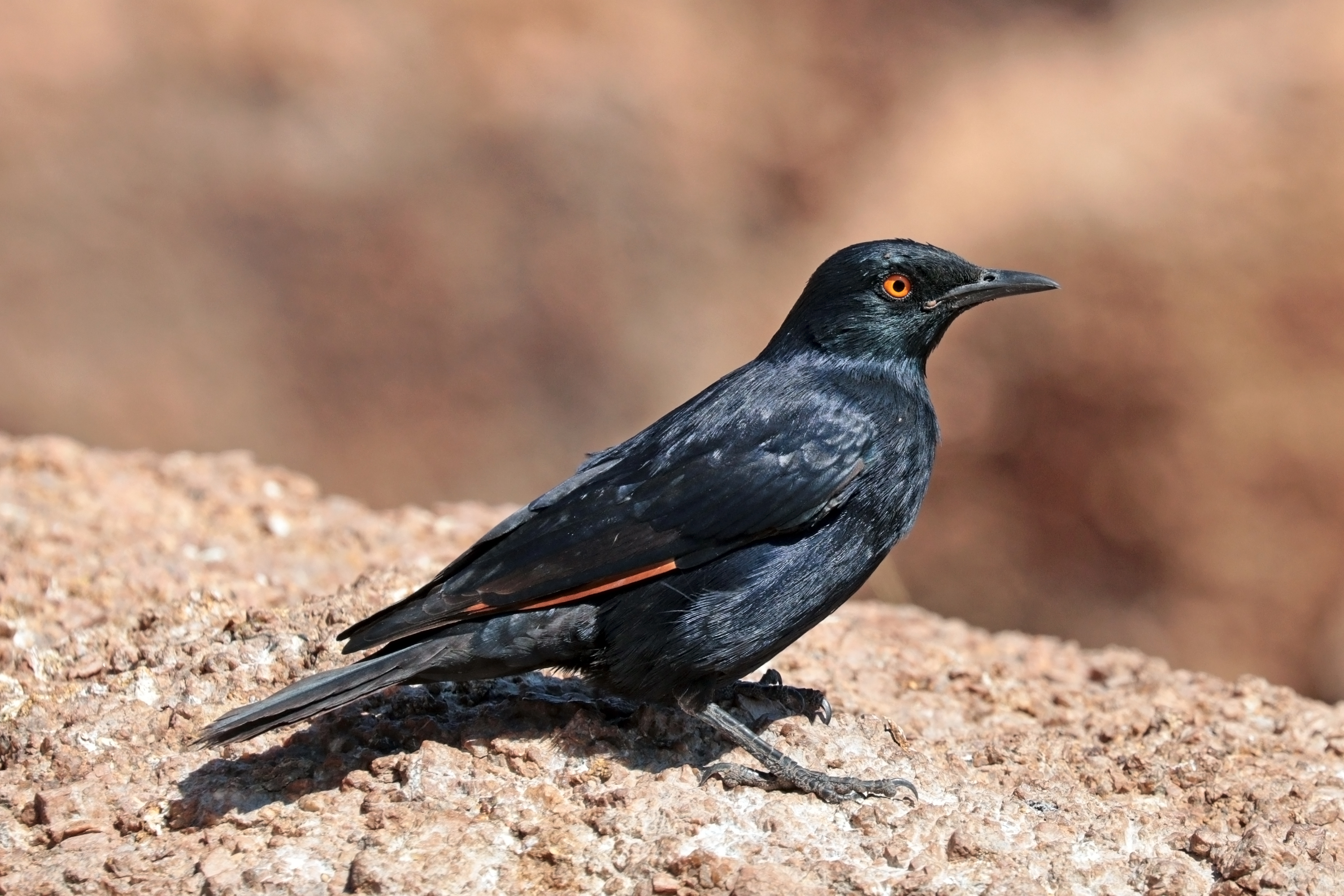
Pale-winged starling in Damaraland, Namibia

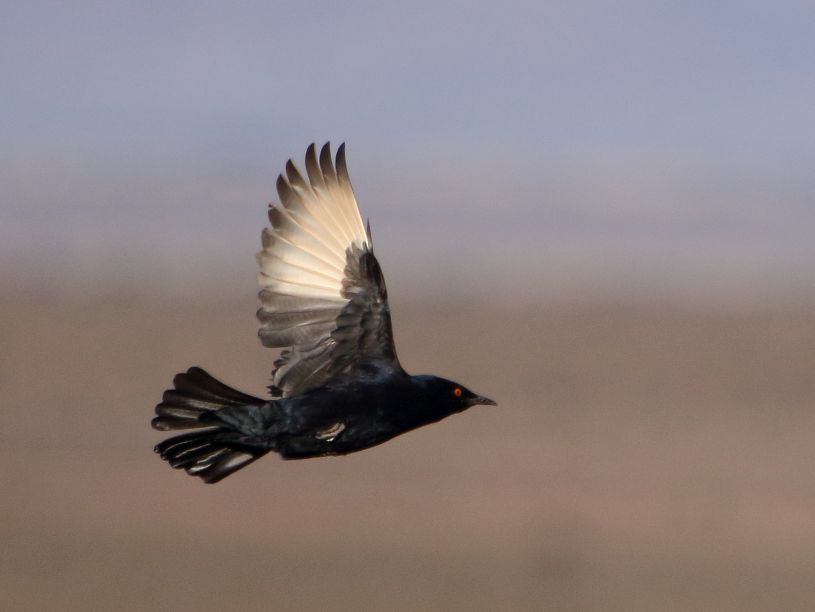
Pale-winged starling in flight

This starling is found in arid and semi-arid areas in South-western Africa, mainly in areas with rocky terrain, cliffs and gorges.

== Diet ==
The pale-winged starling is a generalist omnivore, feeding on a range of fruit and insects.

== Social Behavior ==
It is monogamous.
