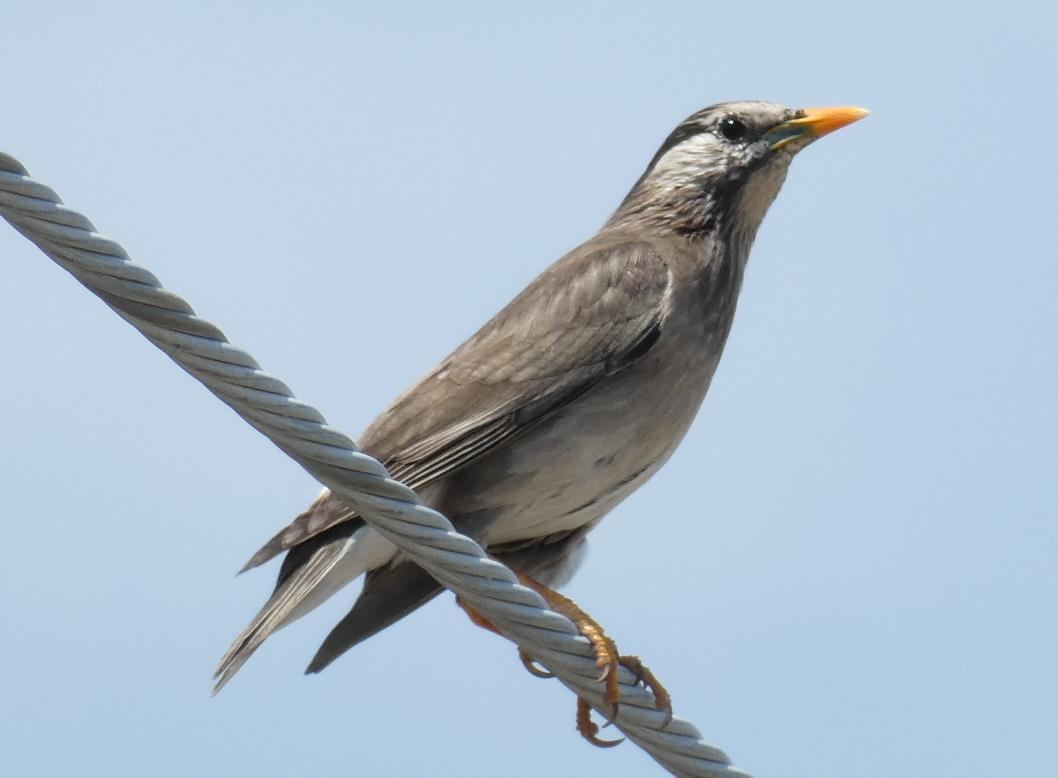
- Adult male
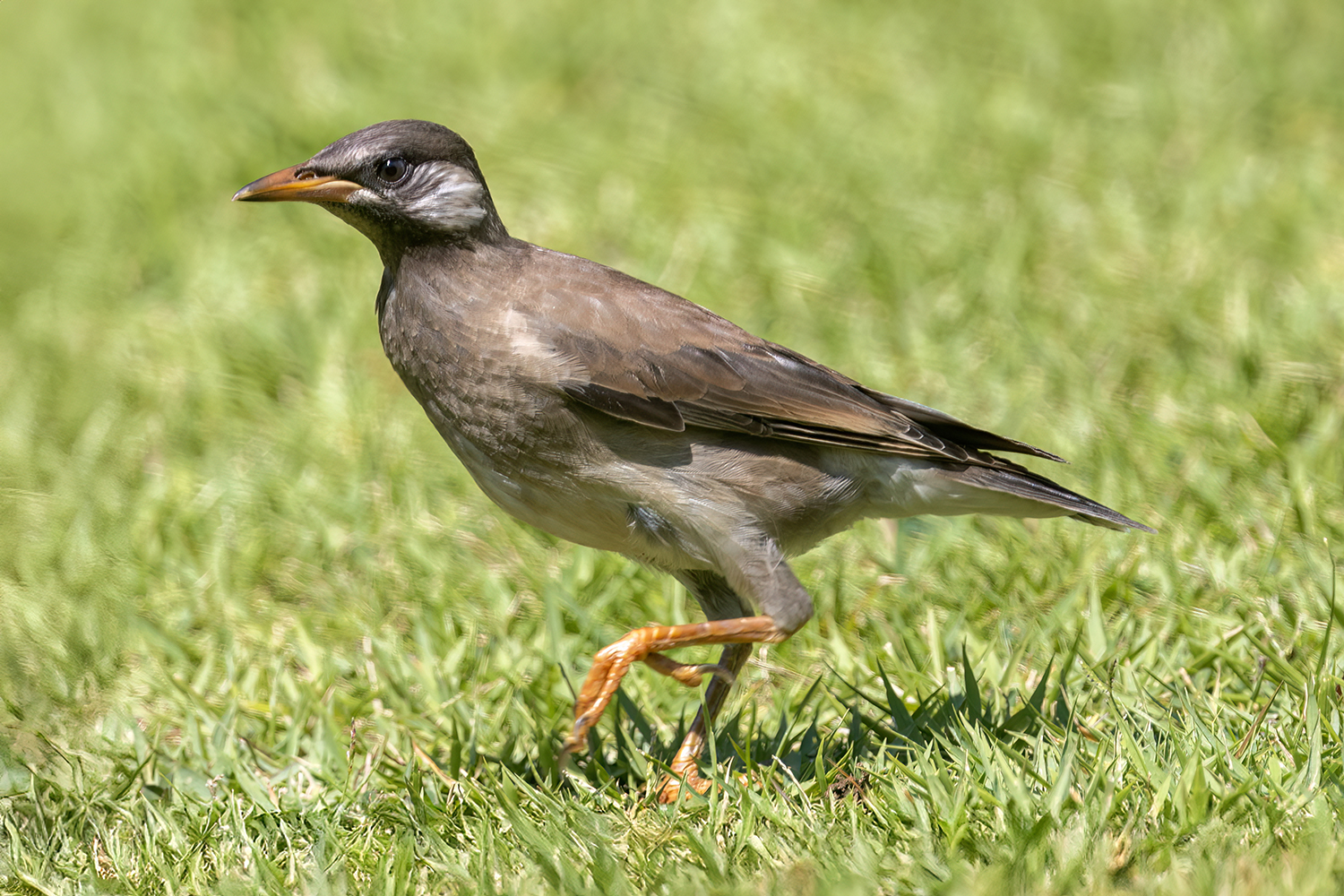
- Adult female

Conservation status
- Least Concern (IUCN 3.1)

Scientific classification
- Kingdom: Animalia
- Phylum: Chordata
- Class: Aves
- Order: Passeriformes
- Family: Sturnidae
- Genus: Spodiopsar
- Species: S. cineraceus

Binomial name
- Spodiopsar cineraceus (Temminck, 1835)
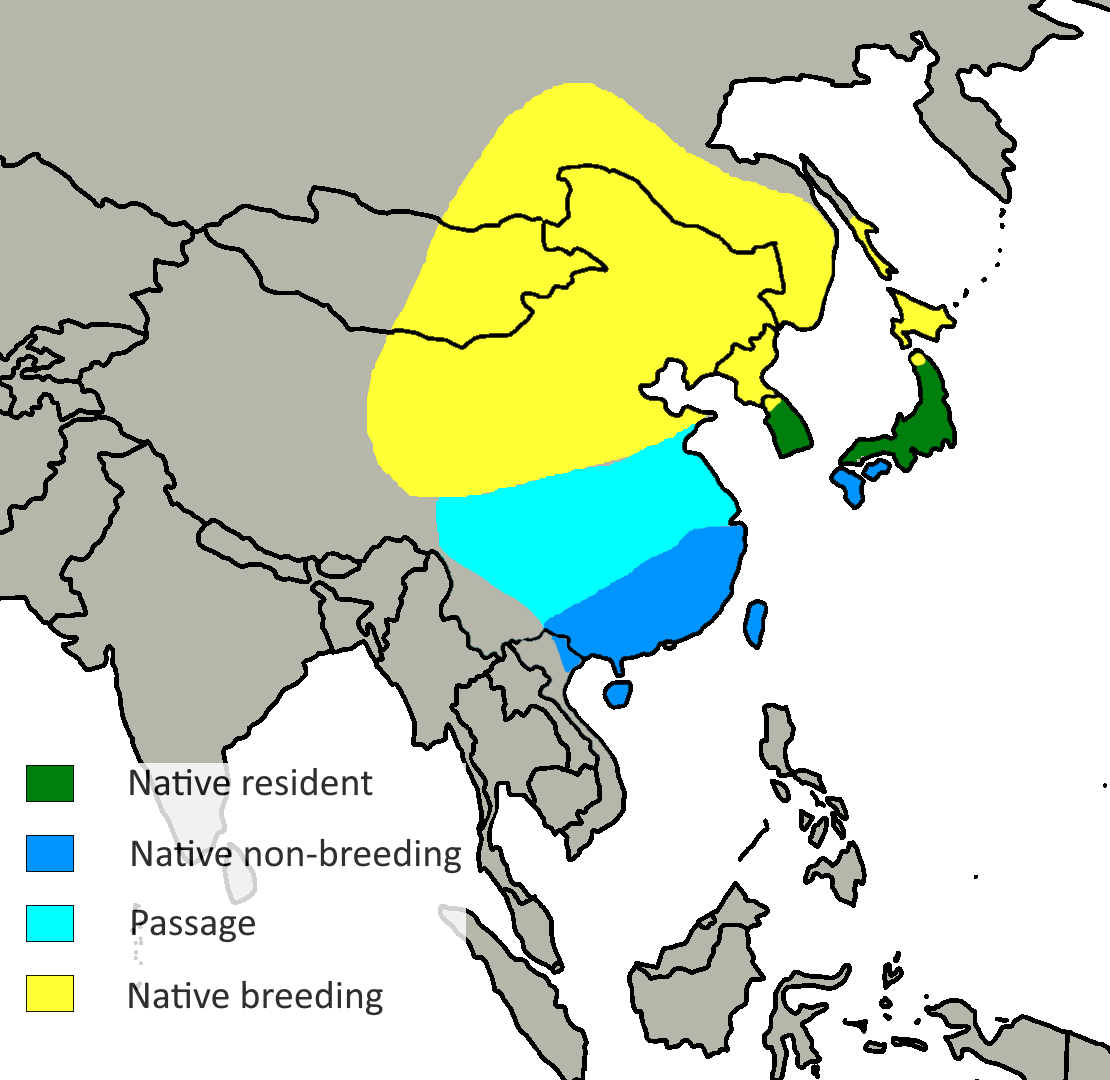

Synonyms
- Sturnus cineraceus

= White-cheeked starling =

Species of bird

The white-cheeked starling or grey starling (Spodiopsar cineraceus) is a passerine bird of the starling family. It is native to eastern Asia where it is a common and well-known bird in much of its range.

== Taxonomy ==
The white-cheeked starling was formerly placed in the genus Sturnus. A molecular phylogenetic study published in 2008 found that the genus was polyphyletic. In the reoganization to create monotypic genera, the white-cheeked starling and the red-billed starling were moved to the resurrected genus Spodiopsar that had been introduced in 1889 by Richard Bowdler Sharpe. The species is monotypic: no subspecies are recognised.

== Description ==
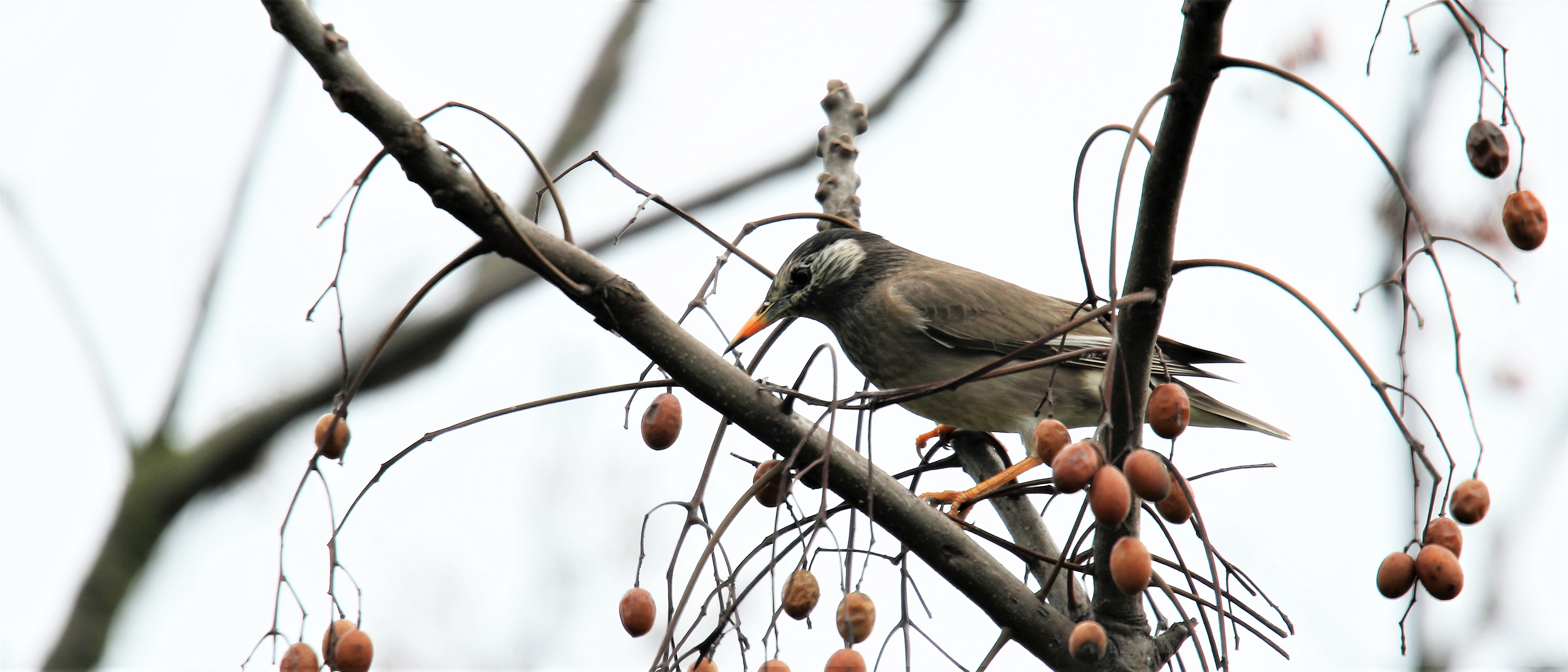
White-cheeked starling

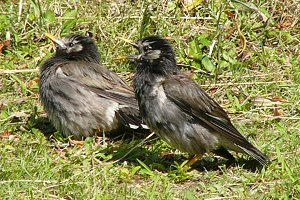
Fledglings

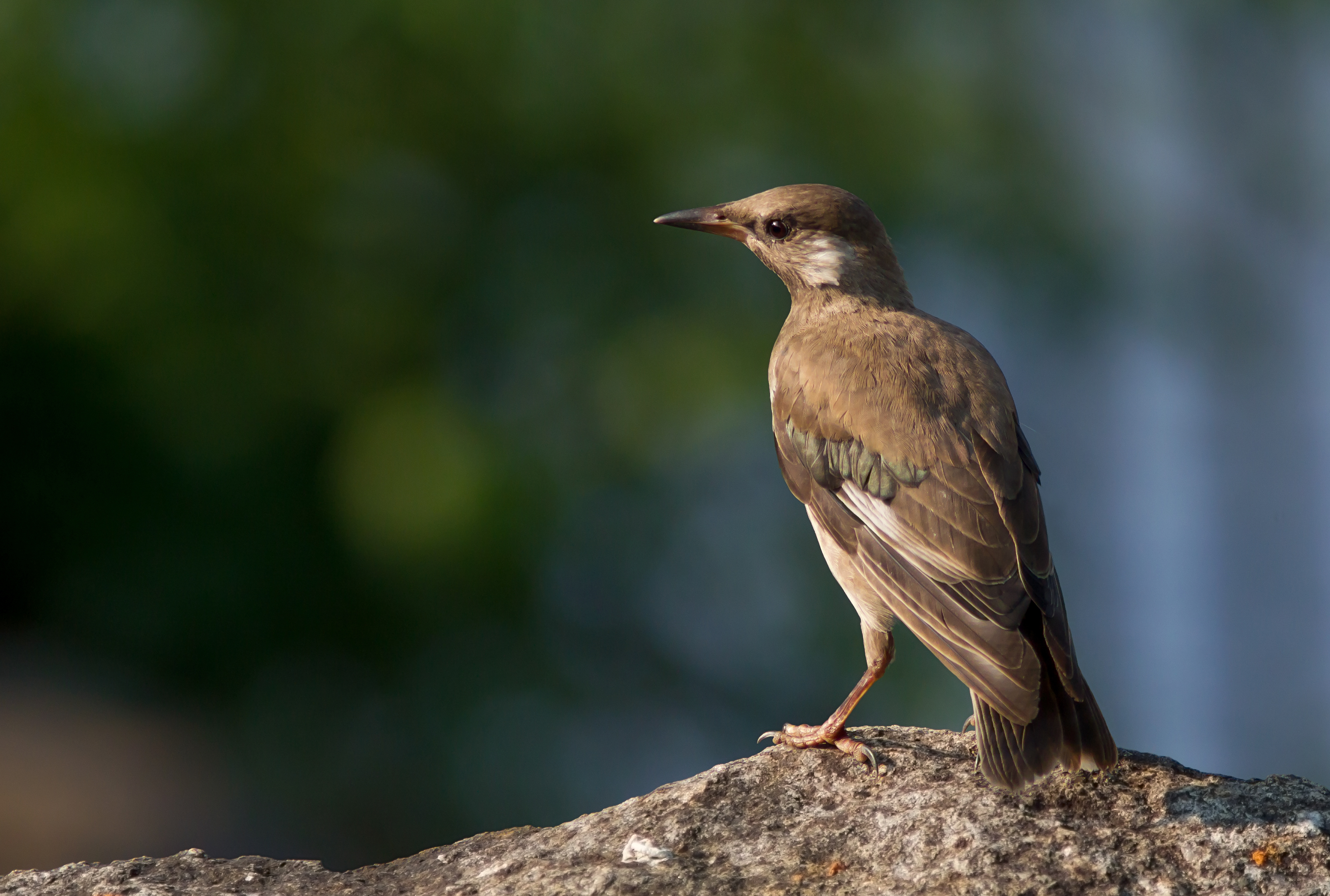
Hybrid of white-cheeked starling and red-billed starling, Japan. Such a hybrid has been recorded by the Japanese Journal of Ornithology.

White-cheeked starlings are 24 cm in length. The adult male is mainly dark grey-brown with a paler belly and a whitish band across the rump. The head is blackish with whitish cheeks and forehead. There is a white border to the tail and white markings on the secondary wing feathers. The legs are pale orange and the bill is orange with a black tip. Adult females are similar to the males but paler and duller.

The juvenile is brown with pale cheeks and rump and no black tip to the bill.

The loud, monotonous call is a series of harsh, creaking notes.

== Distribution and ecology ==
(video) White-cheeked starling feeding in Japan.

The breeding range covers central and north-east China, Korea, Japan and south-east Siberia. In winter, birds from colder regions migrate south to southern and eastern China, South Korea, southern Japan, Taiwan and northern Vietnam with vagrants reaching the Philippines, Thailand and Myanmar. There is a record from Homer, Alaska in 1998 which probably arrived with a ship (West 2002).

It inhabits woodland, farmland, and open country and has also adapted to parks and gardens in urban areas. It is most common in lowland areas (usually below 700m in Japan).

It has a varied diet which includes fruit and insects such as mole crickets.

The breeding season lasts from March to July and often two clutches of eggs are laid during that time. The nest is built in a hole in a tree or building or in a nestbox. Four to nine eggs are laid and are incubated for 14 to 15 days. The young birds fledge 13 to 15 days after hatching.

== Sources ==
- Data related to Sturnus cineraceus at Wikispecies
- Brazil, Mark A. & Yabuuchi, Masayuki (1991): The Birds of Japan. Christopher Helm, London. ISBN 1-56098-030-3
- Jønsson, Knud A.; Fjeldså, Jon (2006). "A phylogenetic supertree of oscine passerine birds (Aves: Passeri)". Zool. Scripta. 35 (2): 149–186. doi:10.1111/j.1463-6409.2006.00221.x.
- MacKinnon, John Ramsay, Phillipps, Karen & He, Fen-qi (2000): A Field Guide to the Birds of China. Oxford University Press. ISBN 0-19-854940-7
- Robson, Craig(2002): A guide to the birds of Southeast Asia: Thailand, Peninsular Malaysia, Singapore, Myanmar, Laos, Vietnam, Cambodia. New Holland, London. ISBN 1-85368-313-2
- West, George C. (2002): A Birder's Guide to Alaska. American Birding Association. ISBN 1-878788-19-1
- Zuccon, Dario; Cibois, Anne; Pasquet, Eric; Ericson, Per G.P. (2006). "Nuclear and mitochondrial sequence data reveal the major lineages of starlings, mynas and related taxa". Molecular Phylogenetics and Evolution. 41 (2): 333–344. doi:10.1016/j.ympev.2006.05.007. PMID 16806992.
