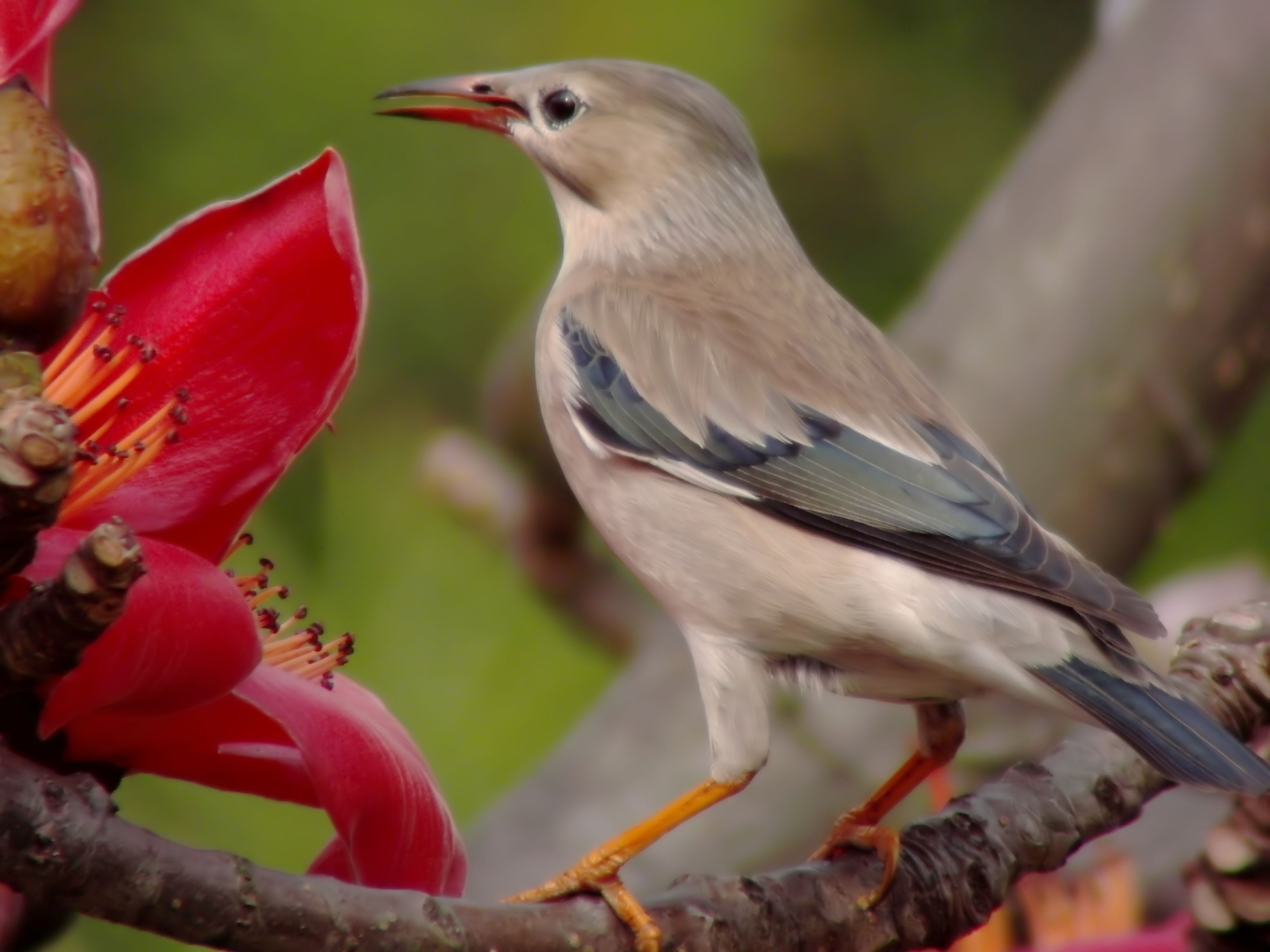

Conservation status
- Least Concern (IUCN 3.1)

Scientific classification
- Kingdom: Animalia
- Phylum: Chordata
- Class: Aves
- Order: Passeriformes
- Family: Sturnidae
- Genus: Spodiopsar
- Species: S. sericeus

Binomial name
- Spodiopsar sericeus (Gmelin, JF, 1789)

Synonyms
- Sturnus sericeus

= Red-billed starling =

Species of bird

The red-billed starling (Spodiopsar sericeus) is a species of starling in the family Sturnidae. It is found in south and southeastern China.

== Taxonomy ==
The red-billed starling was formally described in 1789 by the German naturalist Johann Friedrich Gmelin in his revised and expanded edition of Carl Linnaeus's Systema Naturae. He placed it with the starlings in the genus Sturnus and coined the binomial name Sturnus sericeus. The specific epithet sericeus is Medieval Latin meaning "silken". Gmelin based his account on the "silk starling" from China that had been described and illustrated in 1776 by the English naturalist Peter Brown from a specimen owned by the collector Marmaduke Tunstall.

The red-billed starling was formerly placed in the genus Sturnus. A molecular phylogenetic study published in 2008 found that the genus was polyphyletic. In the reoganisation to create monophyletic genera, the red-billed starling and the white-cheeked starling were moved to the resurrected genus Spodiopsar that had been introduced in 1889 by Richard Bowdler Sharpe. The species is monotypic: no subspecies are recognised.

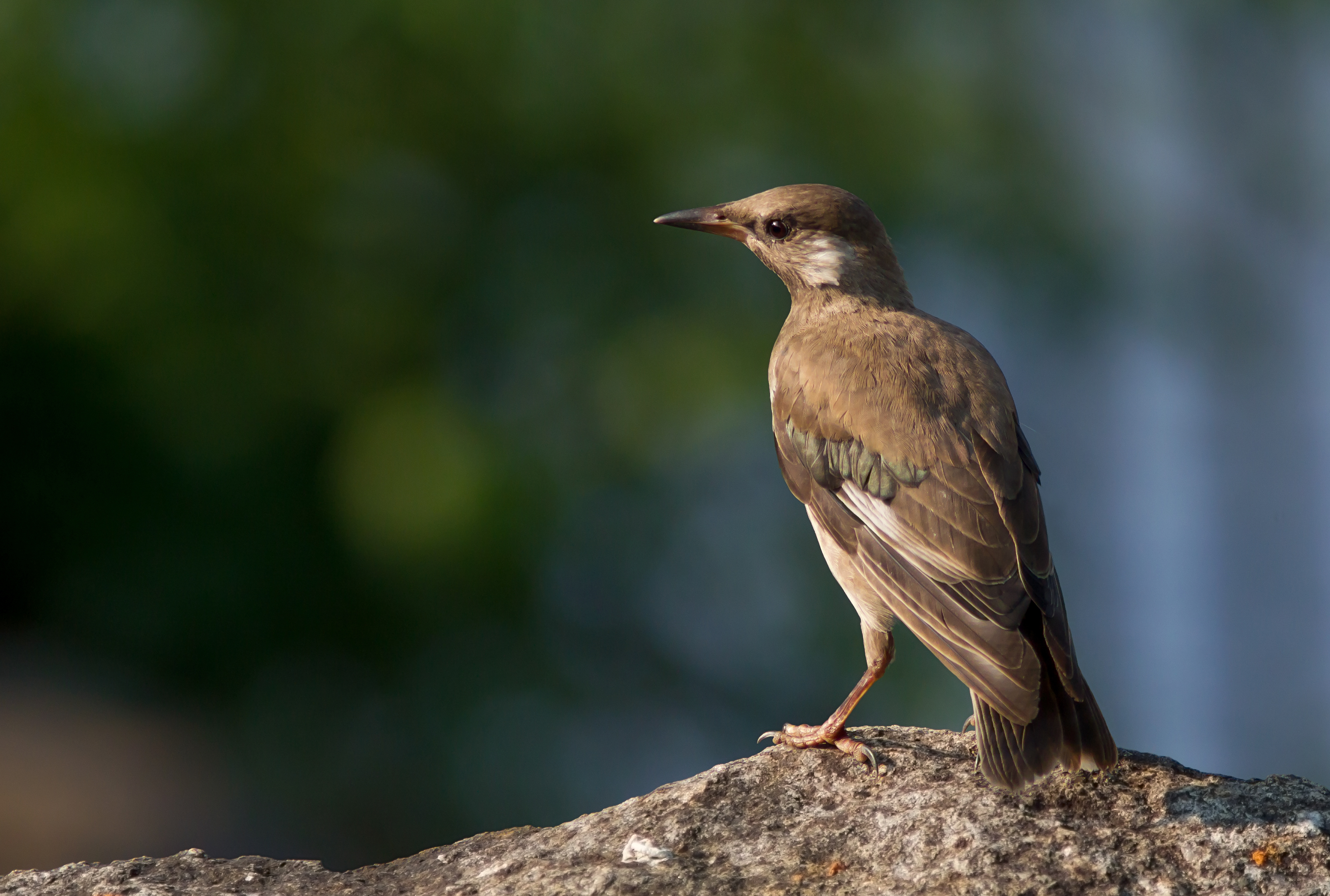
White-cheeked starling and red-billed starling hybrid in Japan.

== Description ==
A medium-sized species for its family, the red-billed starling grows to lengths of 21–24 cm (8.3–9.4 in) and has an average weight of 65 g (2.3 oz). Adult males have slate-grey upperparts contrasting with black wings and tails. The tail has a metallic green wash, while the rump is lighter grey than the rest of the upperparts. The neck and upper back near the head are dark grey, giving the appearance of a broad, undefined "collar". The head itself is white, with a white eye-ring and a red bill. The bill is occasionally black-tipped. The underparts are largely grey with a white belly and undertail-coverts. The legs are yellowish to orange. Females are much browner overall and do not have as much contrast between the body and the head. Additionally, there is a dark band across the cheek and a greyish-brown stripe across the sides of the crown.
