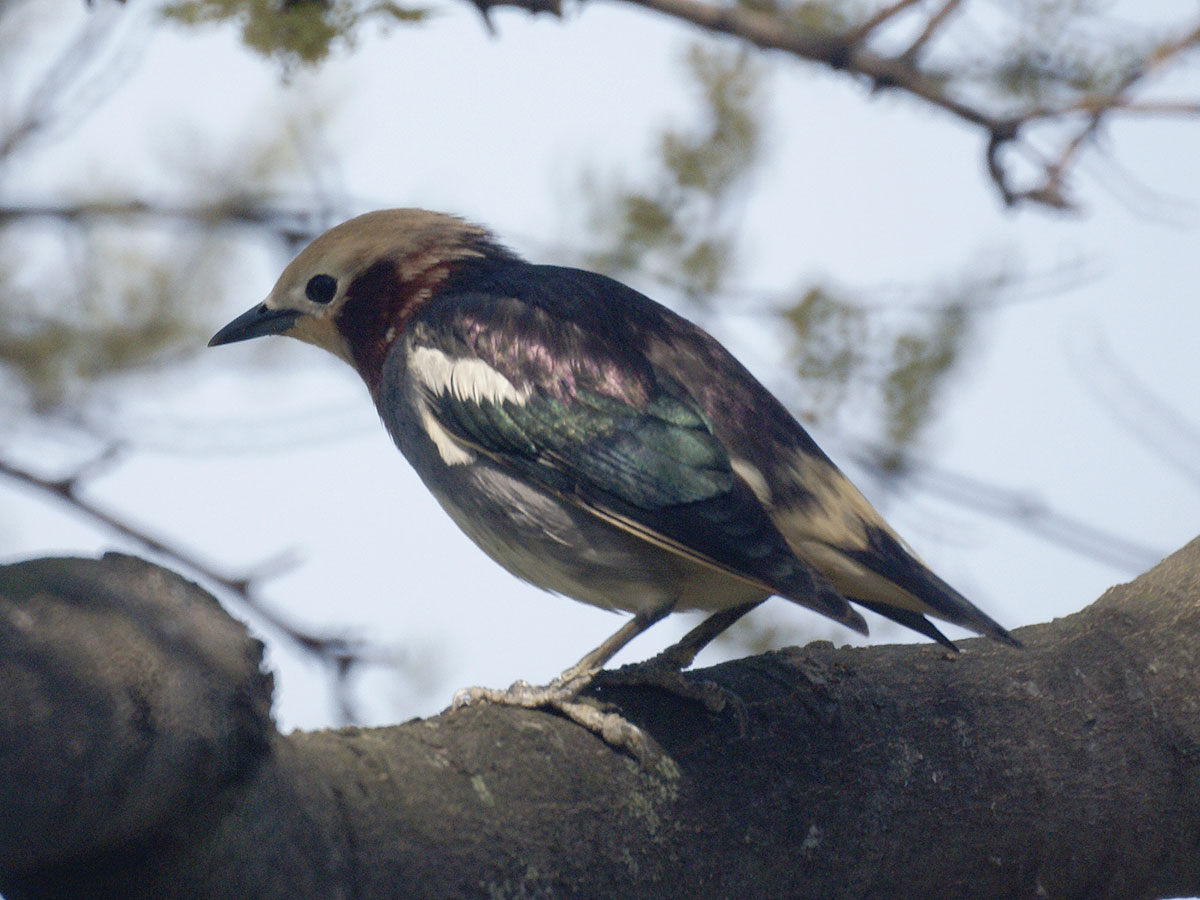

Conservation status
- Least Concern (IUCN 3.1)

Scientific classification
- Kingdom: Animalia
- Phylum: Chordata
- Class: Aves
- Order: Passeriformes
- Family: Sturnidae
- Genus: Agropsar
- Species: A. philippensis

Binomial name
- Agropsar philippensis (Pennant, 1781)

Synonyms
- Sturnia philippensis Sturnus philippensis

= Chestnut-cheeked starling =

Species of bird

The chestnut-cheeked starling (Agropsar philippensis) is a species of starling in the family Sturnidae. It breeds in Japan and the Russian islands of Sakhalin and Kuriles; it winters in Taiwan, the Philippines and northern Borneo.

The chestnut-cheeked starling was previously placed in the genus Sturnus. It was moved to the resurrected genus Agropsar based on the results of two molecular phylogenetic studies that were published in 2008.
