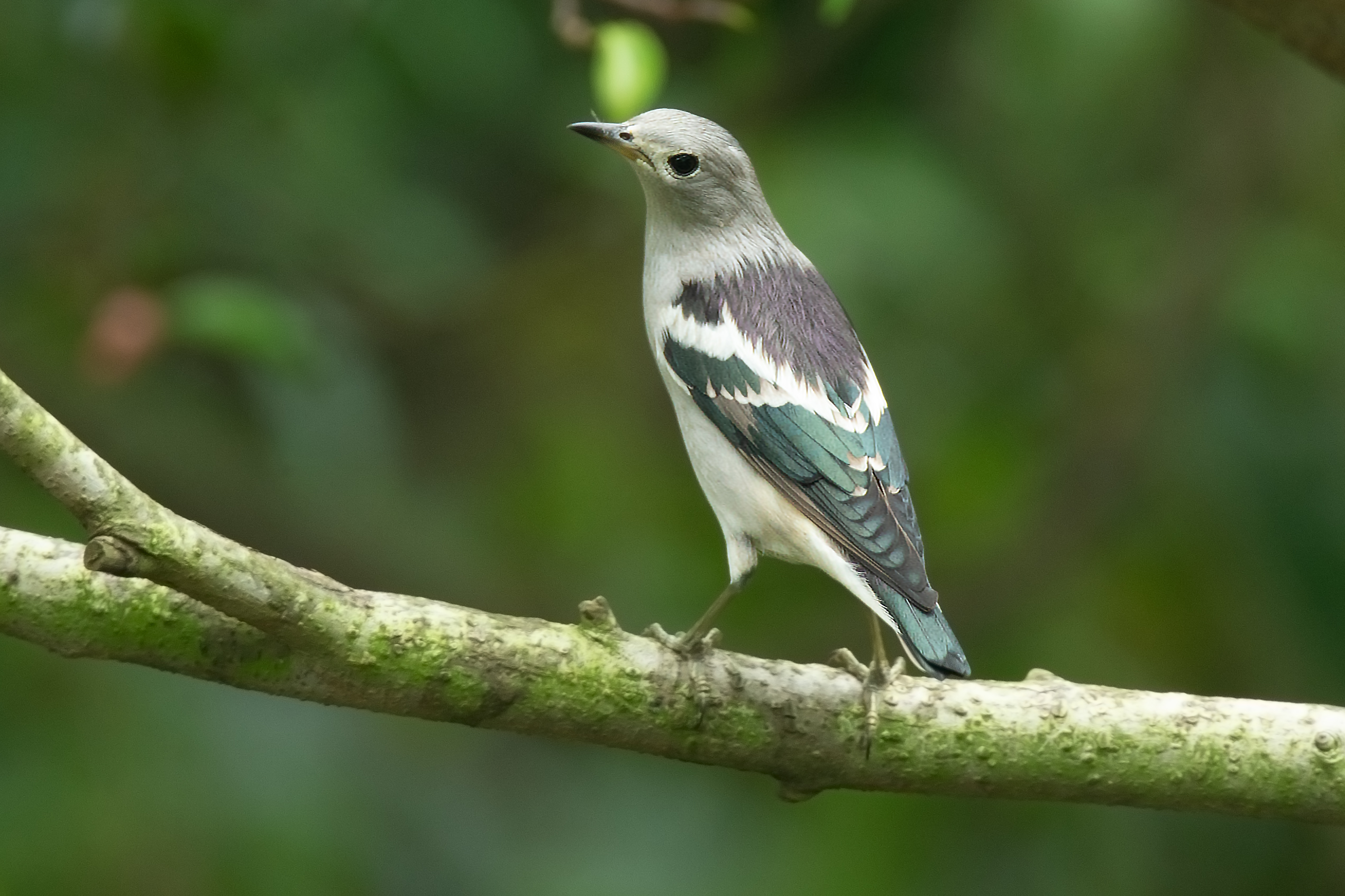

Conservation status
- Least Concern (IUCN 3.1)

Scientific classification
- Kingdom: Animalia
- Phylum: Chordata
- Class: Aves
- Order: Passeriformes
- Family: Sturnidae
- Genus: Agropsar
- Species: A. sturninus

Binomial name
- Agropsar sturninus (Pallas, 1776)

Synonyms
- Sturnia sturnina; Sturnus sturnina

= Daurian starling =

Species of bird

The Daurian starling (Agropsar sturninus), or purple-backed starling, is a species of bird in the starling family found in the eastern Palearctic from eastern Mongolia and southeastern Russia to North Korea and central China.

== Taxonomy and systematics ==
The Daurian starling was previously placed in the genus Sturnus. It was moved to the resurrected genus Agropsar based on the results of two molecular phylogenetic studies that were published in 2008.

== Description ==
The Daurian starling is distinguished from other starling species by its dark mantle and crown and narrow wing bars.

== Distribution and habitat ==
The natural habitats of the Daurian starling are boreal forests and temperate forests.
