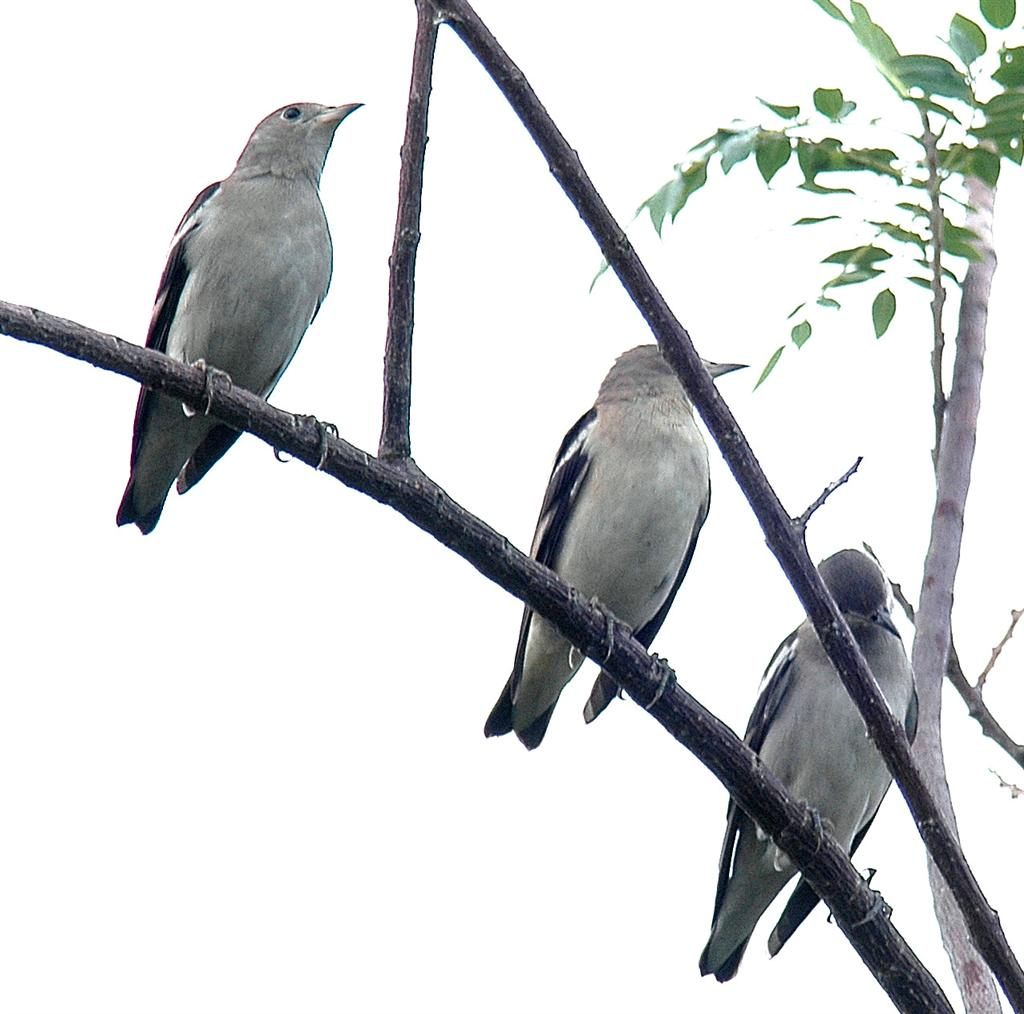
- Daurian starling (Agropsar sturninus)

Scientific classification
- Kingdom: Animalia
- Phylum: Chordata
- Class: Aves
- Order: Passeriformes
- Family: Sturnidae
- Genus: Agropsar; Oates, 1889

= Agropsar =

Genus of birds

Agropsar is a genus of Asian birds in the family Sturnidae. It is sometimes merged with Sturnus or Sturnia

These two species were formerly placed in the genus Sturnus. They were moved to the resurrected genus Agropsar based on the results of two molecular phylogenetic studies published in 2008.

== Species ==
Image	Scientific name	Common name	Distribution
	Agropsar sturninus	Daurian starling	eastern Mongolia and south-eastern Russia to North Korea and central China
	Agropsar philippensis	Chestnut-cheeked starling	Japan and the Russian islands of Sakhalin and Kuriles
