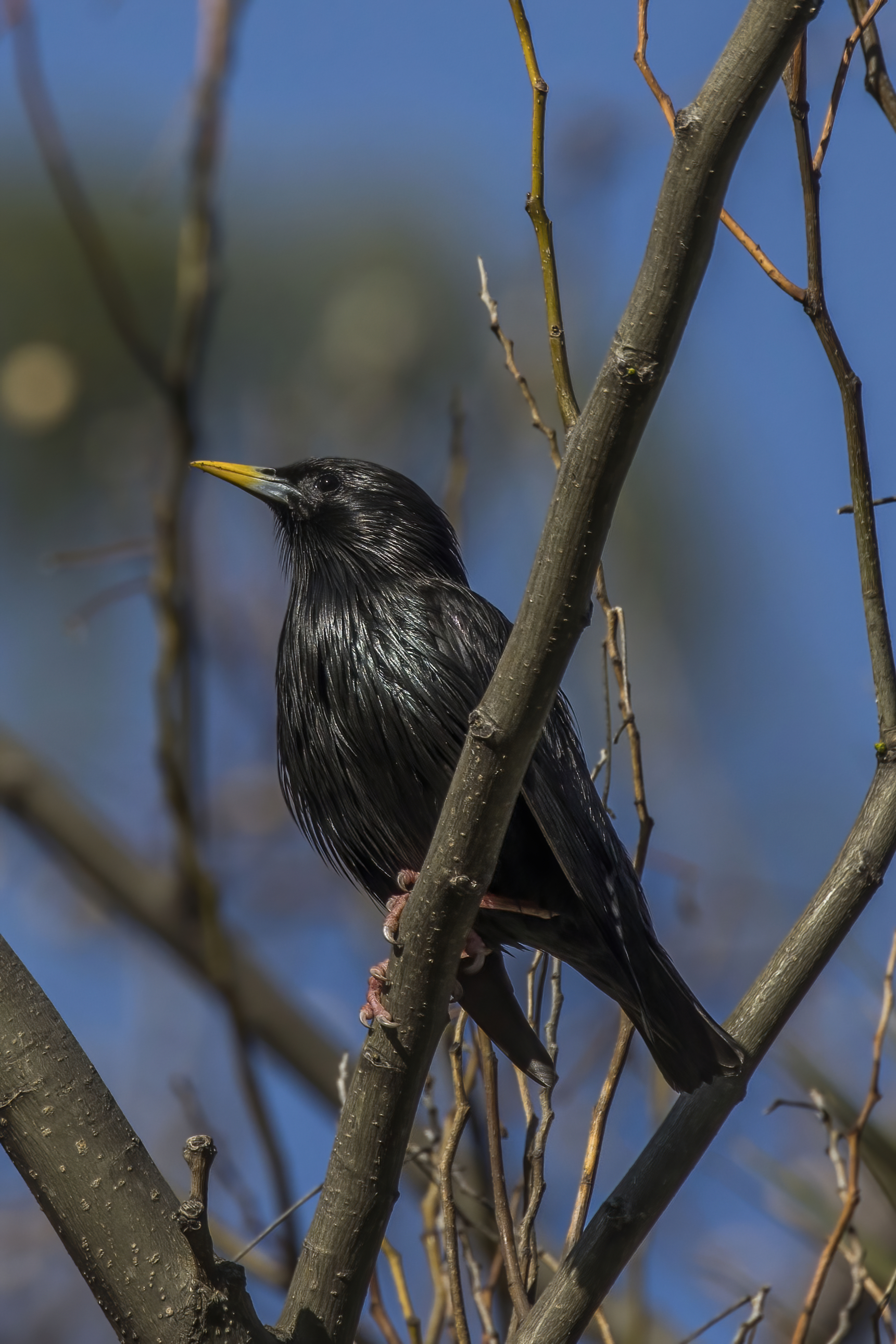
- Breeding male, Trujillo, Spain
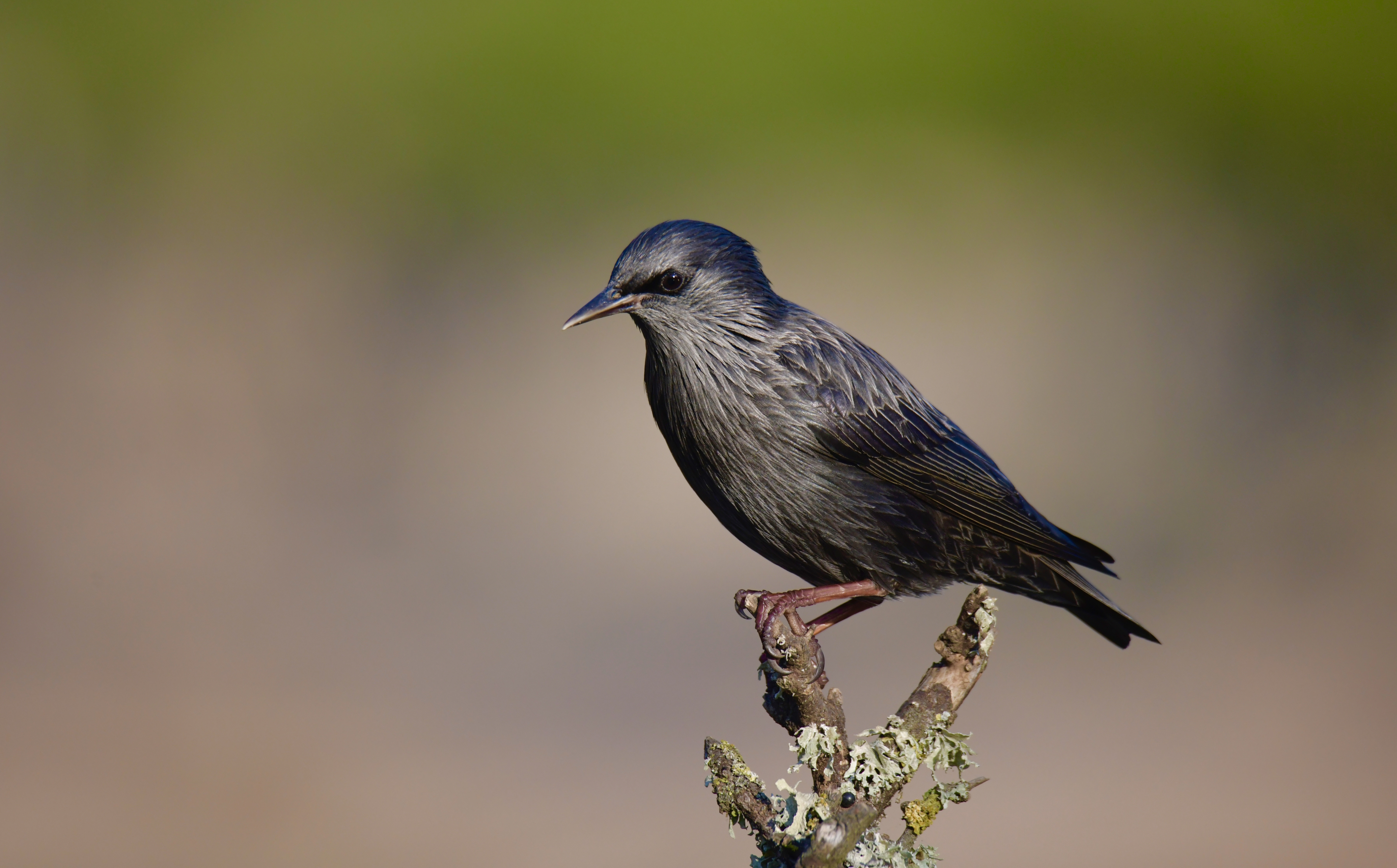
- Non-breeding, Setúbal, Portugal

Conservation status
- Least Concern (IUCN 3.1)

Scientific classification
- Kingdom: Animalia
- Phylum: Chordata
- Class: Aves
- Order: Passeriformes
- Family: Sturnidae
- Genus: Sturnus
- Species: S. unicolor

Binomial name
- Sturnus unicolor Temminck, 1820
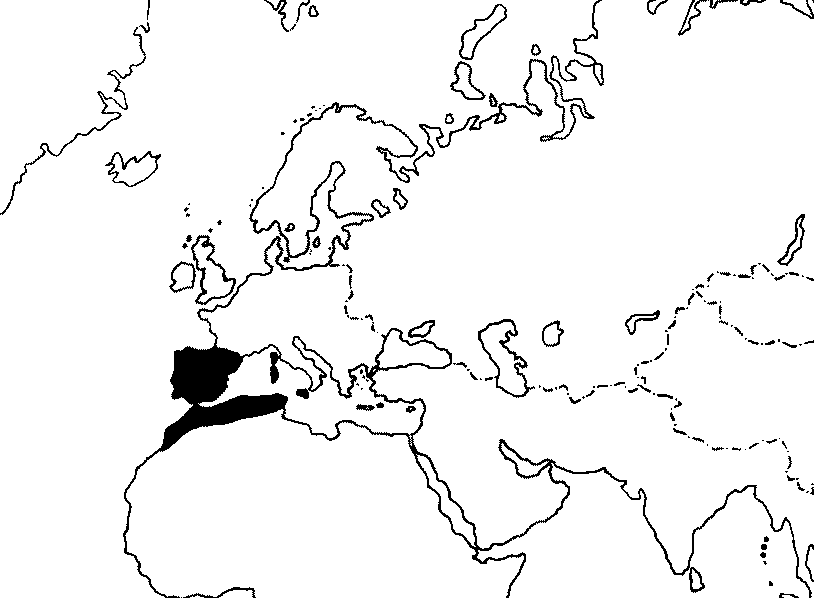

= Spotless starling =

Species of bird

The spotless starling (Sturnus unicolor) is a passerine bird in the starling family, Sturnidae. It is closely related to the common starling (S. vulgaris), but has a much more restricted range, confined to the Iberian Peninsula, Northwest Africa, southernmost France, and the islands of Sicily, Corsica and Sardinia. It is largely non-migratory.

== Taxonomy and systematics ==
Subsequent to the recent split of the genus Sturnus, this species and the common starling are the only species retained in the genus. Hybrids with the common starling are found occasionally where the breeding ranges overlap in southwestern France and northeastern Spain.

== Description ==
The adult spotless starling is very similar to the common starling, but marginally larger (21–23 cm length; 70–100 g weight), and has darker, oily-looking black plumage, slightly purple- or green-glossed in bright light, which is entirely spotless in spring and summer, and only with very small pale spots in winter plumage, formed by the pale tips of the feathers. It also differs in having conspicuously longer throat feathers (twice the length of those on common starlings), forming a shaggy "beard" which is particularly obvious when the bird is singing. Its legs are bright pink. In summer, the bill is yellow with a bluish base in males and a pinkish base in females; in winter, it is duller, often blackish. Young birds are dull brown, darker than young common starlings, and have a black bill and brown legs. Confusion with the common starling is particularly easy during the winter, when common starlings are abundant throughout the spotless starling's range, but also in summer where their breeding ranges overlap in northeastern Spain and the far southwest of France. It can also be confused with the common blackbird (Turdus merula), which differs most obviously in its longer tail and lack of plumage gloss.

Like the common starling, it walks rather than hops, and has a strong direct flight, looking triangular-winged and short-tailed. It is a noisy bird and a good mimic; its calls are similar to the common starling's, but louder.

== Distribution and habitat ==
The spotless starling uses a wide range of habitats and can be found in any reasonably open environment, from farmland and olive groves to human habitation. The highest population densities are in open grazed holm oak woods, and in urban habitats such as Gibraltar, where it is common. The population has grown in recent decades with a northward expansion in range, spreading to the whole of Spain (previously absent from the northeast) between 1950 and 1980, and colonising locally along the southern coast of mainland France since 1983. Like its more common relative, it is an omnivore, taking a wide variety of invertebrates, berries, and human-provided scraps. It is gregarious, forming sizeable flocks, often mixed with common starlings, of up to 100,000 in winter.

Like most starlings, it is a cavity-nesting species, breeding in tree holes, buildings and in cliff crevices. It typically lays three to five eggs.

== Gallery ==
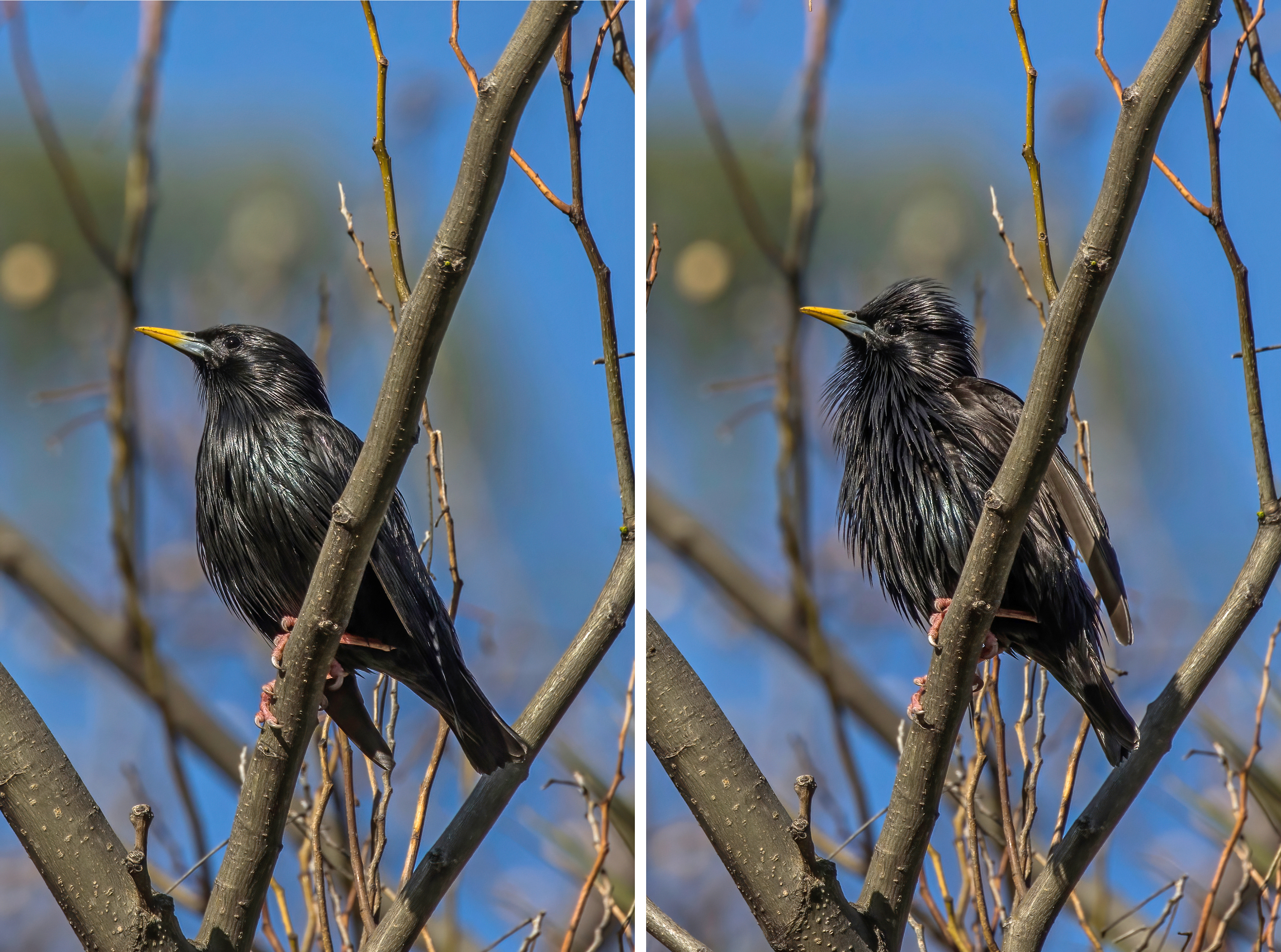
Mating display of raising feathers

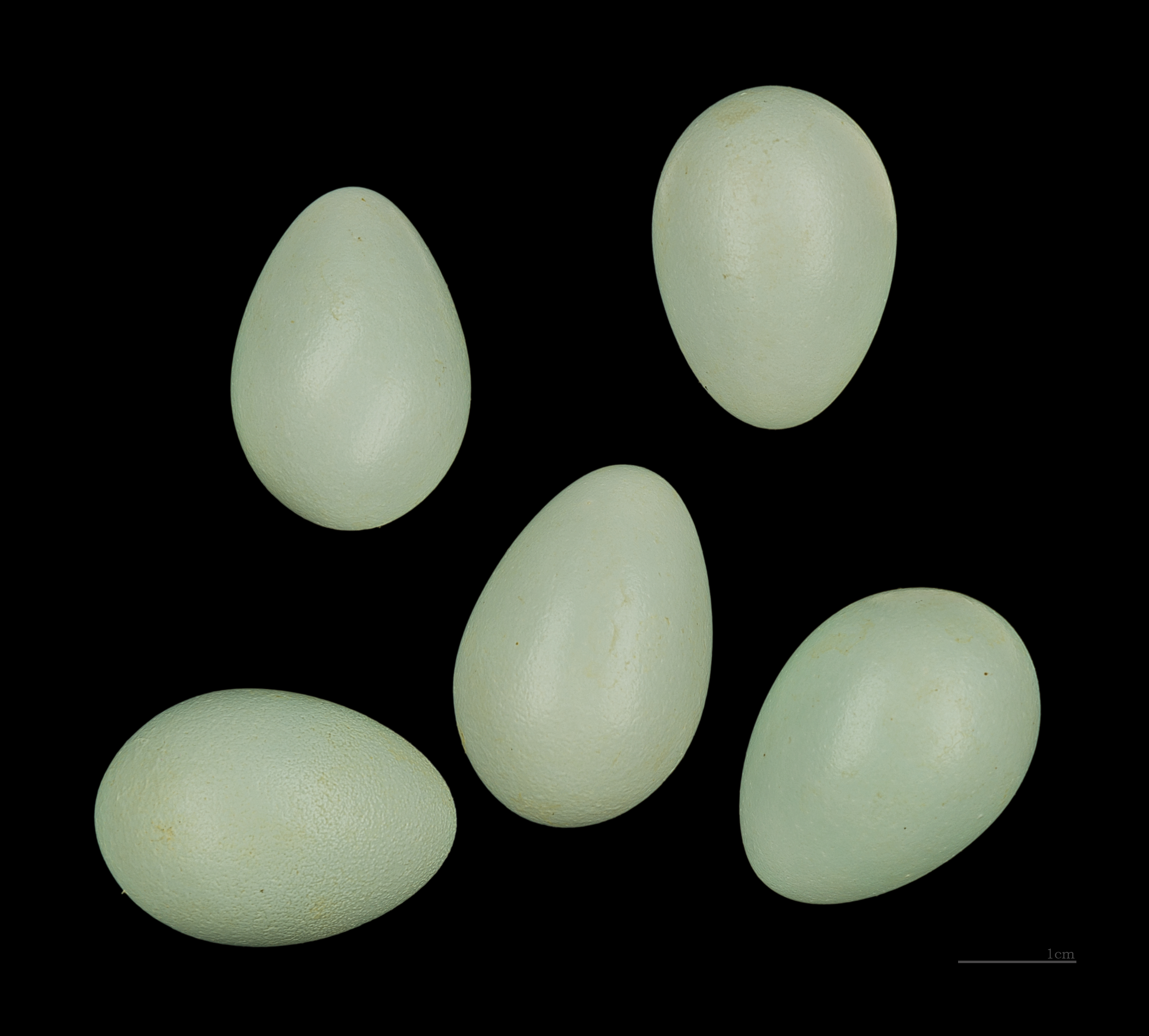
Eggs of Sturnus unicolor - MHNT

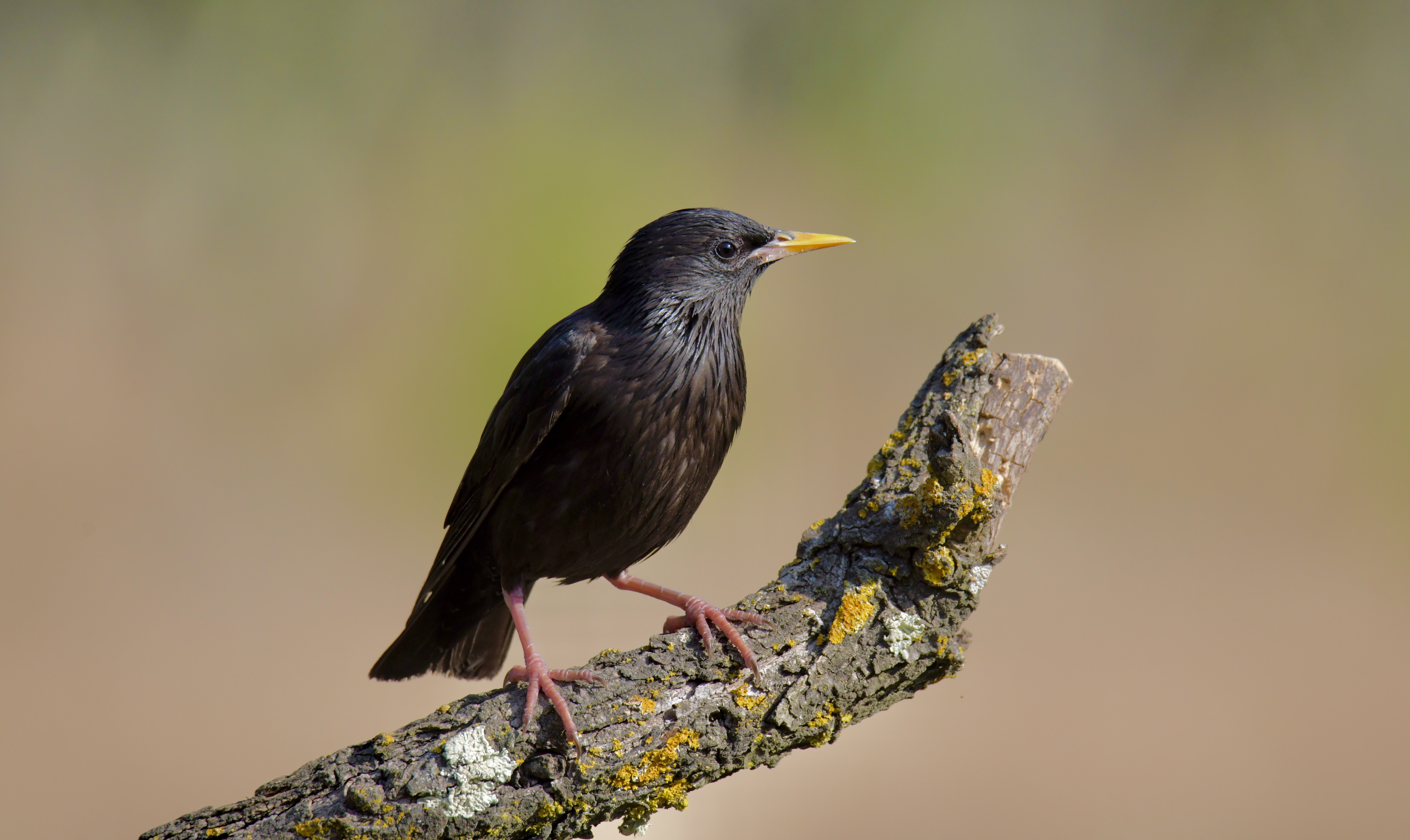
Breeding adult in Setúbal, Portugal
