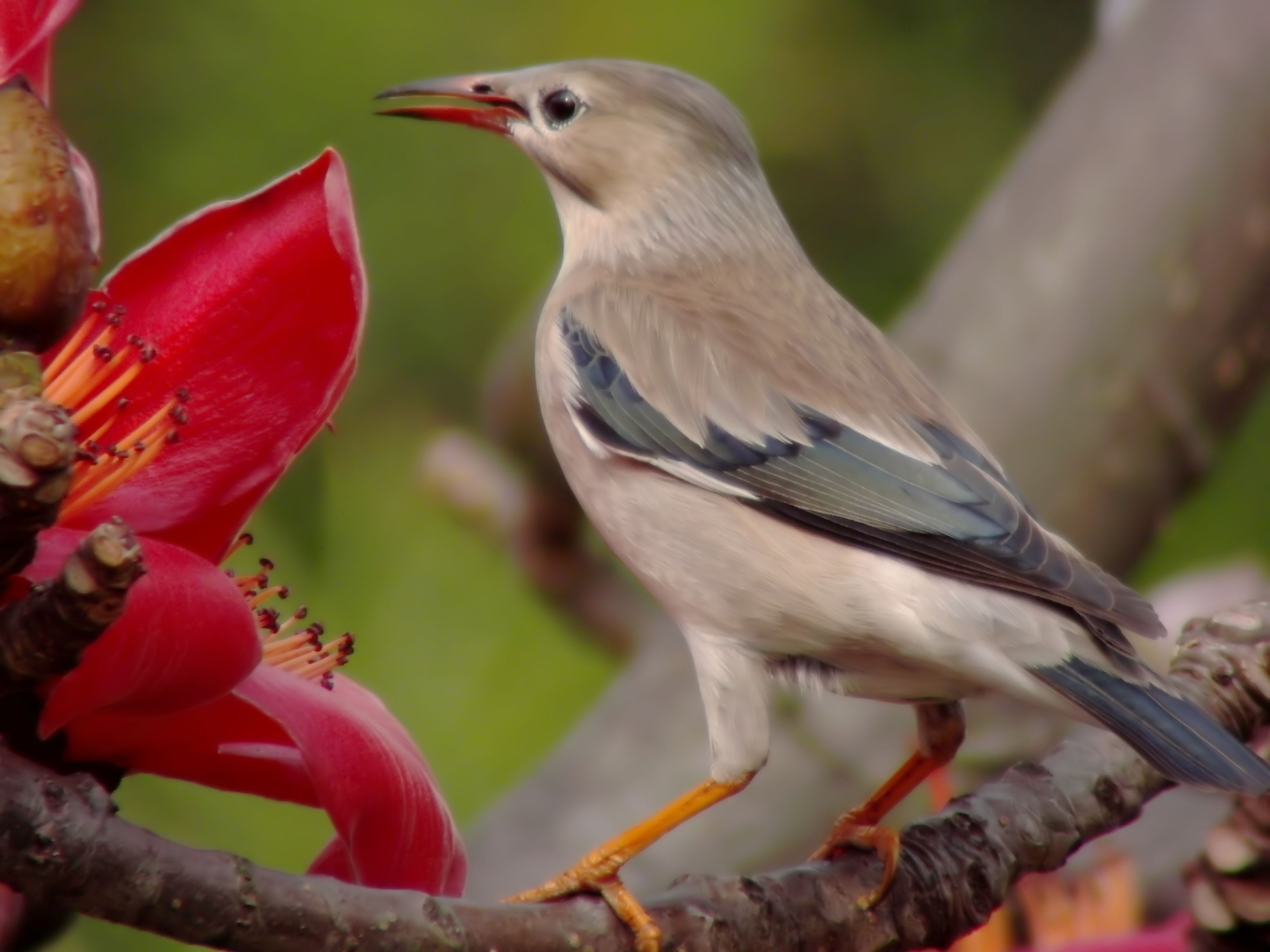
- Red-billed starling (Spodiopsar sericeus )

Scientific classification
- Kingdom: Animalia
- Phylum: Chordata
- Class: Aves
- Order: Passeriformes
- Family: Sturnidae
- Genus: Spodiopsar; Sharpe, 1889

Type species
- Sturnus sericeus J. F. Gmelin, 1789

= Spodiopsar =

Genus of birds

Spodiopsar is a genus of Asian birds in the family Sturnidae.

== Taxonomy ==
The genus Spodiopsar was introduced in 1889 by the English ornithologist Richard Bowdler Sharpe. The name was to replace Poliopsar, introduced by Sharpe in 1888, which was preoccupied by Poliopsar Cassin, 1867. Sharpe subsequently designated the type species as Sturnus sericeus J.F. Gmelin, 1789, the red-billed starling. The genus name combines the Ancient Greek spodios meaning "ash-coloured" and psar meaning "starling".

The genus contains two species.

Image	Scientific name	Common name	Distribution
	Spodiopsar sericeus	Red-billed starling	south and southeastern China
	Spodiopsar cineraceus	White-cheeked starling	central and north-east India, China, Korea, Japan and south-east Siberia
