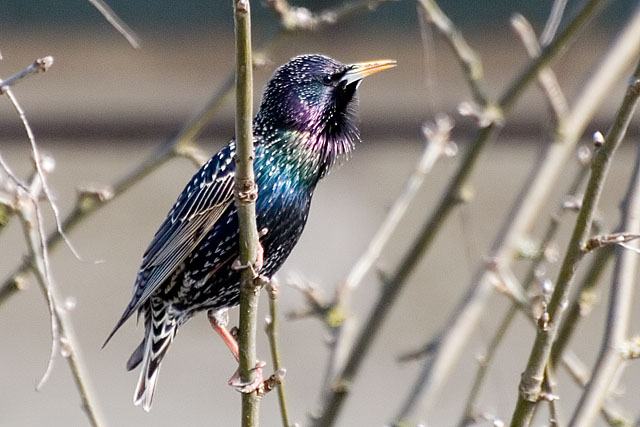
- European starling (Sturnus vulgaris vulgaris)

Scientific classification
- Kingdom: Animalia
- Phylum: Chordata
- Class: Aves
- Order: Passeriformes
- Family: Sturnidae
- Genus: Sturnus; Linnaeus, 1758

Type species
- Sturnus vulgaris Linnaeus, 1758

Species
- see text

= Sturnus =

Genus of birds

Sturnus is a genus of starlings. Formerly a large genus encompassing many Eurasian starlings, it was found to be non-monophyletic, with several other genera nested within it. Consequently, molecular phylogenetic studies led to a major revision of its classification, restricting Sturnus to just two species, the common starling (S. vulgaris) and the spotless starling (S. unicolor), which together form the sister group to the remaining Eurasian starlings and mynas.

This genus has representatives across most of Eurasia and one species, the common or European starling, has been introduced to North America, South Africa, Australia and New Zealand. The more northerly breeding species are completely or partially migratory, wintering in warmer regions.

The Sturnus starlings are terrestrial species; they walk rather than hop, and have modifications to the skull and its muscles for open-bill probing. The latter adaptation has facilitated the spread of this genus from humid tropical southern Asia to cooler regions of Europe and Asia.

Starlings nest in holes in trees or buildings. They are omnivorous and mostly feed on the ground; they specialise in taking invertebrates from just below the surface. This is facilitated by the head adaptations mentioned above, which enable the birds to probe with the bill open, closing it to secure prey items. The plumages within this group are variable, but all the species have the starling's familiar triangular wing shape. They are capable of imitating many sounds and they have been recorded mimicking sounds such as that of a squeaky door.

== Taxonomy and systematics ==
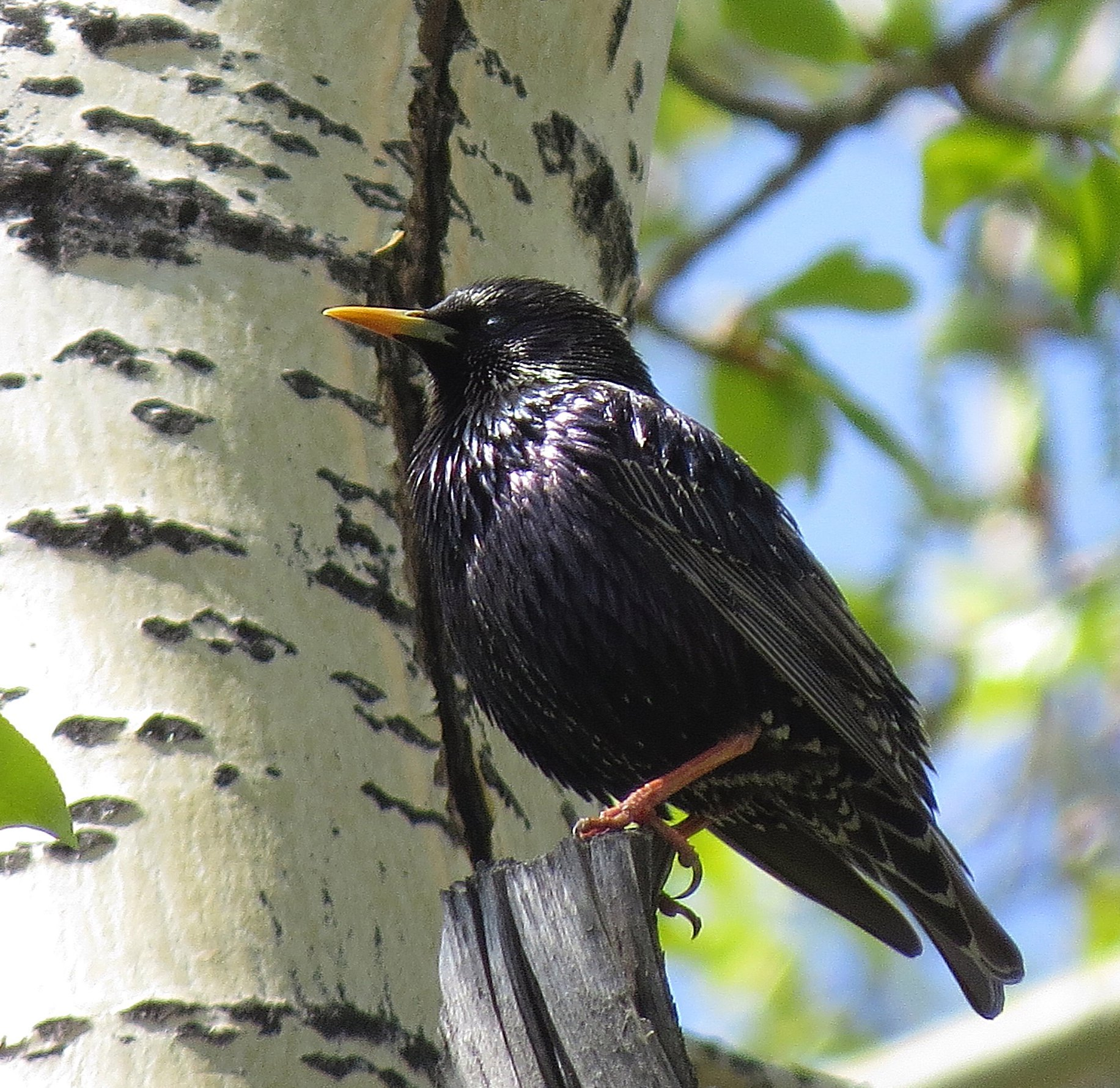
A common starling in eastern Siberia

The genus Sturnus was introduced in 1758 by the Swedish naturalist Carl Linnaeus in the tenth edition of his Systema Naturae. The genus name Sturnus is Latin for "starling". Of the four species included by Linnaeus, the common starling (Sturnus vulgaris) is considered the type species.

The genera Pastor, Gracupica, Agropsar, Sturnornis, Sturnia and Spodiopsar were all formerly included within Sturnus, but were subsequently recognized as separate genera following molecular phylogenetic studies that demonstrated the non-monophyly of the traditional genus. In addition, two species formerly placed in Sturnus (A. burmannicus and A. melanopterus) were assigned to Acridotheres, leaving only two species (S. vulgaris and S. unicolor) in Sturnus.

The common and spotless starlings are particularly closely related, and interbreed to some extent where their ranges overlap in southwestern France and northeastern Spain. The non-migratory spotless starling may be descended from a population of ancestral S. vulgaris that survived in an Iberian refugium during an Ice Age retreat.

=== Species ===
Two extant species are recognized:

Image	Scientific name	Common name	Distribution
	Sturnus vulgaris	Common starling	Native range is in temperate Europe and western Asia
	Sturnus unicolor	Spotless starling	Iberian Peninsula, northwestern Africa, southernmost France, and the islands of Corsica, Sardinia and Sicily

== Mating system ==
A mating system is much more than just reproduction. It includes all the benefits and costs that the female weighs when choosing a mate and the competition that males, and sometimes females, go through when trying to win a mate. The genus Sturnus uses three major mechanisms in their complex mating system: parental care, differential allocation, and (arguably) the sexy son hypothesis.

=== Parental care ===
Male Sturnus unicolor individuals face a choice when it comes to the mating season. They can either invest in parental care, through helping feed the young, provide shelter, etc. and be monogynous or they can control many nests at one time, increase the number of matings they engage in and be polygynous. To add to this, much of the time their choice is biological. Sturnus unicolor males are more likely to be polygynous and be less involved in parental care if they have higher levels of testosterone. In addition, females of the Sturnus vulgaris species see a decrease in their fitness if the male is polygynous because there is no assistance in nestling feeding. Offspring success per nest, however, is significantly higher if there is parental care from the male, but males see greater overall fitness when they are polygynous. This is the trade off and the cost/benefit balance that each individual must go through.

=== Differential allocation ===
To try and make the male stay faithful to her, a female will act aggressively towards another female that solicits his attention. If the male looks like he is going to leave, she will perform aggressive acts towards a prospecting female, in an attempt to have the male stay. Males respond to this behaviour, and the resident female's aggressive acts towards prospecting females do play a role in whether the male stays monogamous. The female then responds to whether or not the male sticks around to invest in parental care. If the father stays monogamous, she will allocate more maternal steroid hormones to the eggs she lays later. Doing so negates the effects of hatching asynchrony. When the female is alone, she has difficulty finding enough resources to fully take care of all the offspring. Therefore, if the male is monogamous, she allows all the young to hatch at a similar time, and at a similar nutritional state. If the male is not around, she will allow asynchronous hatching and even allow a brood reduction if she cannot take care of all the young. This allocation of resources to the more desirable situation is differential allocation.

=== Sexy son hypothesis ===
The sexy son hypothesis is an attempt to explain why a female may choose to mate with a previously mated (polygynous) male. This hypothesis suggests that the female mates with a polygynous male because he has already proven himself successful and will therefore be likely to pass these successful genes to his sons. Although it may not be ideal for the female at the time, her genes are likely to get passed on for many generations due to her sons' success. Those sons are likely to exhibit many of the behavioral qualities of the father, causing them to also be highly successful in their sexual maturity.

This hypothesis has its critics, however. One counter-argument is that a female who chooses a polygynous mate, for a chance that her sons grow up to be successful and pass her genes on, would be risking her own health. The hypothesis has been shown to be flawed in some scenarios. A female that mates with a previously mated male, who is also likely to leave her nest, fledges far fewer young than one that mates with a monogynous male.

== Former species ==
Formerly, some authorities also considered the following species (or subspecies) as species within the genus Sturnus:

- Straw-headed bulbul (as Sturnus zeylanicus)
