= Mental time travel =

Capacity to mentally reconstruct personal events from the past

In psychology, mental time travel is the capacity to mentally reconstruct personal events from the past (episodic memory) as well as to imagine possible scenarios in the future (episodic foresight/episodic future thinking). The term was coined by Thomas Suddendorf and Michael Corballis, building on Endel Tulving's work on episodic memory. (Tulving proposed the alternative term chronesthesia.)

Mental time travel has been studied by psychologists, cognitive neuroscientists, philosophers and in a variety of other academic disciplines. Major areas of interest include the nature of the relationship between memory and foresight, the evolution of the ability (including whether it is uniquely human or shared with other animals), its development in young children, its underlying brain mechanisms, as well as its potential links to consciousness, the self, and free will.

== Overview, terminology, and relationship to other cognitive capacities ==
Declarative memory refers to the capacity to store and retrieve information that can be explicitly expressed, and consists of both facts or knowledge about the world (semantic memory) and autobiographical details about one's own experiences (episodic memory). Tulving (1985) originally suggested that episodic memory involved a kind of 'autonoetic' ('self-knowing') consciousness that required the first-person subjective experience of previously lived events, whereas semantic memory is associated with 'noetic' (knowing) consciousness but does not require such mental simulation.

It has become increasingly clear that both semantic and episodic memory are integral for thinking about the future. Mental time travel, however, specifically refers to the 'autonoetic' systems, and thus selectively comprises episodic memory and episodic foresight.

The close link between episodic memory and episodic foresight has been established with evidence of their shared developmental trajectory, similar impairment profiles in neuropsychiatric disease and in brain damage, phenomenological analyses, and with neuroimaging. Mental time travel may be one of several processes enabled by a general scenario building or construction system in the brain. This general capacity to generate and reflect on mental scenarios has been compared to a theatre in the mind that depends on the working together of a host of components.

Investigations have been conducted into diverse aspects of mental time travel, including individual differences relating to personality, its instantiation in artificial intelligence systems, and its relationship with theory of mind and mind-wandering. The study of mental time travel in general terms is also related to – but distinct from – the study of the way individuals differ in terms of their future orientation, time perspective, and temporal self-continuity.

=== Cultural and Linguistic Influences ===
While the neural substrates for mental time travel may be universal, the habitual deployment of this capacity is influenced by language and culture. Linguistic patterns, such as the use of spatial metaphors (e.g., placing the future "behind" the body in Aymara) or grammatical structures like "future-time reference," can tune attention and bias how individuals represent and use time in decision-making. Furthermore, traditional event-based cultures demonstrate that mental time travel can operate over relative, situational chronologies rather than abstract, metric timelines.

== Brain regions involved ==
Various neuroimaging studies have elucidated the brain systems underlying the capacity for mental time travel in adults. Early fMRI studies on the topic revealed a number of close correspondences between remembering past experiences and imagining future experiences in brain activity.

=== fMRI mapping of brain regions ===
Addis et al. conducted an fMRI study to examine neural regions mediating construction and elaboration of past and future events.

The elaboration phase, unlike the construction phase, has overlap in the cortical areas comprising the autobiographical memory retrieval network. In this study, it was also found that the left hippocampus and the right middle occipital gyrus were significantly activated during past and future event construction, while the right hippocampus was significantly deactivated during past event construction. It was only activated during the creation of future events. This differentiation suggests the right hippocampus may specifically respond to the novelty of constructing a new event representation .

Episodic future thinking involves multiple component processes: retrieval and integration of relevant information from memory, processing of subjective time, and self-referential processing. D'Argembeau et al.'s study found that the ventral medial prefrontal cortex and posterior cingulate cortex are the most activated areas when imagining future events that are relevant to one's personal goals than to unrelated ones. This shows that these brain regions play a role in personal goal processing, which is a critical feature of episodic future thinking.

=== Brain regions involved in the 'what' and 'where' of an event ===
Cabeza et al. conducted a positron emission tomography (PET) scan study on a group of human test subjects to identify the brain regions involved in temporal memory, which is based on a linear progression of events. Since 'recollecting a past episode involves remembering not only what happened but also when it happened', PET scans were used to find the areas of the brain that were activated when trying to remember a certain word in a sequence. The results show that temporal-order memory of past events involves the frontal and posterior brain regions and item retrieval shows neural activity in the medial temporal and basal fore brain regions.

== Evolution and human uniqueness ==
The ability to travel mentally in time – especially into the future – has been highlighted as a potential prime mover in human evolution, enabling humans to prepare, plan and shape the future to their advantage. However, the question of whether or to what extent animals other than human beings can engage in mental time travel has remained controversial.

One proposal, the Bischof-Köhler hypothesis, posits that non-human animals cannot act upon drive states they do not currently possess, for example seeking out water while currently fully quenched. Other proposals suggest that different species may have some capacities, but are limited because of shortcomings in a range of component capacities of mental scenario building and imagination. A number of studies have claimed to have demonstrated mental time travel in animals including, most notably, various great apes, crows, ravens, and western scrub jays, but these have been subjected to a number of criticisms and simpler alternative explanations have been proposed for the results. This debate is ongoing.

If mental time travel is unique to humans, then it must have emerged over the last 6 million years since the line leading to modern humans split from the line leading to modern chimpanzees. Perhaps the first hard evidence for the evolution of mental time travel in humans comes in the form of Acheulean bifacial handaxes associated with Homo erectus. Acheulean tools are complex and appear to have required advanced planning to create. There is also evidence that they were often crafted in one location and then taken elsewhere for repeated use.

A number of important adaptive functions have been identified that rely to some degree on the capacity to remember the past and imagine the future. These functions include predicting future emotional reactions (affective forecasting), deliberate practice, intertemporal choice, navigation, prospective memory, counterfactual thinking, and planning.

Recent theoretical frameworks, introduced by Jeffery R. L. Pendleton and Prof. Nicola S. Clayton at the University of Cambridge, distinguish between objective physical time and "mind time," defined as the subjective, agentic navigation of a dynamic temporal landscape. While individual mental time travel (MTT) exists in other species, humans are thought to uniquely engage in transpersonal extended mental time travel (teMTT). This capacity couples individual episodic simulation with shared narratives, storytelling, and external artifacts (such as clocks and calendars) to synchronize mind time across individuals. This system enables the vicarious experience of remote histories and the collective coordination of futures across generations.

=== Episodic-like memory and planning for the future in great apes ===
Osvath et al. conducted a study on apes to show that they have the ability of foresight. The study consisted of testing for self-control, associative learning, and envisioning in chimpanzees and orangutans through a series of experiments. Critics questioned whether these animals truly exhibited mental time travel, or whether it was associative learning that caused them to behave as they did. The Bischof-Kohler hypothesis says that animals cannot anticipate future needs, and this study by Osvath tried to disprove the hypothesis.

The scientists showed that when the apes were presented with a food item in conjunction with a utensil that could be used to actually eat that particular food, these animals chose the utensil instead of food. They anticipated a future need for the utensil that overcame the current want for just a food reward. This is an example of mental time travel in animals. It was not a result of associative learning, that they actually chose the utensil instead of the food reward, since the scientists ran another experiment to account for that. Other examples, such as food caching by birds, may be examples of mental time travel in non-humans. Even survival instinct by certain animals such as elephants, in response to imminent danger, could involve mental time travel mechanisms.

Another study to show that great apes have the ability of foresight was conducted by Martin-Ordas G. et al. These scientists were able to show that "apes remember in an integrated fashion what, where and when" a particular event had happened. Two experiments were conducted in this study, the first being an investigation of the content of the memories of apes i.e. could these animals remember when and where two types of food they were shown before are hidden. The second experiment explored the structure of the memories. It was found that the apes' memories were formed in an integrated what–where–when structure. All these findings suggest that it is not instinctive or learning predispositions that made the animals behave the way they did, but rather that they have the ability to mentally time travel. However, comparative psychologists are divided about this conclusion.

=== Episodic-like memory in western scrub-jays ===
In their study to show that birds exhibit episodic-like memory, Clayton et al. used 3 behavioral criteria: content, structure, and flexibility, to decide whether the food caching habits of these birds were evidence of their ability to recall the past and plan for the future. Content involved remembering what happened based on a specific past experience. Structure required the formation of a 'what-where-when' representation of the event. Finally, flexibility was used to see how well the information could be organized and re-organized, based on facts and experiences. Mental time travel involves the use of both episodic future thinking and semantic knowledge. This study also contradicts the Bischof-Kohler hypothesis by showing that some animals may mentally time travel into the future or back to the past. However this interpretation has remained controversial.

=== Episodic-like memory in cuttlefish ===
Beyond vertebrates, recent research on cephalopods suggests that mental time travel may have evolved convergently in species with vastly different neural architectures. Cuttlefish (Sepia officinalis) have demonstrated episodic-like memory by retrieving "what-where-when" information and showing graded self-control in delay-of-gratification tasks. This suggests that the capacity to integrate past events to guide future behavior is an adaptive response to ecological pressures like solitary foraging, rather than a trait exclusive to social mammals or birds.

== Development in children ==
Studies into the development of mental time travel in infancy suggest that the involved component processes come online piece by piece. Most of the required psychological subcomponents appear to be available by approximately age four. This includes the fundamental capacity to prepare for two mutually exclusive possible future events, which appears to develop between the ages of 3 and 5.

Two and three-year-old children can report some information about upcoming events, and by ages four and five, children can talk more clearly about future situations. However, there is concern that children may understand more than they can articulate, and that they may say things without fully understanding. Thus, researchers have tried to examine future-oriented action. A carefully controlled study found that four-year-olds could already remember a specific problem they saw in a different room sufficiently enough to prepare for its future solution. These results suggest that children by the end of the preschool years have developed some fundamental capacity for foresight, capacities that continue to develop throughout childhood and adolescence.

== Measurement ==
Studies of mental time travel require the measurement of both episodic memory and episodic foresight.

=== Episodic memory ===
Episodic memory is typically measured in human adults by asking people to report or describe past events that they had experienced. Many studies provide participants with information at one point in the study and then assess their memory for this information at a later point in the study. The advantage of these studies is that they allow the accuracy of recall to be assessed. However, Cheke and Clayton found that such different measurements of memory do not mutually correspond enough and may therefore capture different facets of memory. A more general limitation with studies in this field is that they fail to capture people's actual memories for real-life events, just like in other studied animals.

Many studies focus on asking people to recall episodes from their own lives. Some of them attempt to verify the accuracy of recall by comparing participants' memories to those of family, friends or relatives who experienced the same event, or in some cases by comparing peoples' memories of an event to public information about the event. However it is not always easy to verify the accuracy of recall, so many measures of episodic memory do not do this, focusing instead on aspects of people's verbal descriptions of their memories.

Three commonly used measures that do not verify the accuracy of people's memories are as follows:

1. Dritschel et al. adapted the Controlled Oral Word Association Test to assess the fluency with which people recall personal autobiographical episodes in specific given time periods (e.g., last week, last year, last 5 years, etc.) in a specific time limit (e.g., 1 min).
2. Baddeley and Wilson used a 4-point scale with which to rate participants' memories as (3) specific, (2) intermediate, (1) general, and (0) nil, based on the level of the detail provided in their description.
3. Levine and colleagues designed the Autobiographical Interview to distinguish between episodic and semantic components of episodic memories based on participants' verbal descriptions.

=== Episodic foresight ===
Miloyan and McFarlane performed a systematic review of episodic foresight measurement instruments used in human adults and found that most of these measures were adapted from measures of episodic memory.

1. The measure by Dritschel et al. based on the Controlled Oral Word Association Test was adapted by MacLeod and colleagues to assess episodic foresight.
2. Williams et al. adapted the 4-point scale from Baddeley and Wilson to assess episodic foresight.
3. The Autobiographical Interview by Levine and colleagues which was designed to distinguish the episodic and semantic components of episodic memories was adapted by Addis and colleagues to measure episodic foresight.

The authors of the systematic review noted that a limitation of all such episodic foresight measures is that they do not compare people's simulation of future events to objective preparatory behaviors or to the actual occurrence of future events. Thus, none of the available measures verify the accuracy or relevance of people's imaginings. This is in contrast to studies of episodic foresight in children and animals that require participants to demonstrate episodic foresight with behaviors to compensate for their lack of verbal ability.

== See also ==
- Hyperthymesia
- Prospection
- Time perception
- Time perspective
