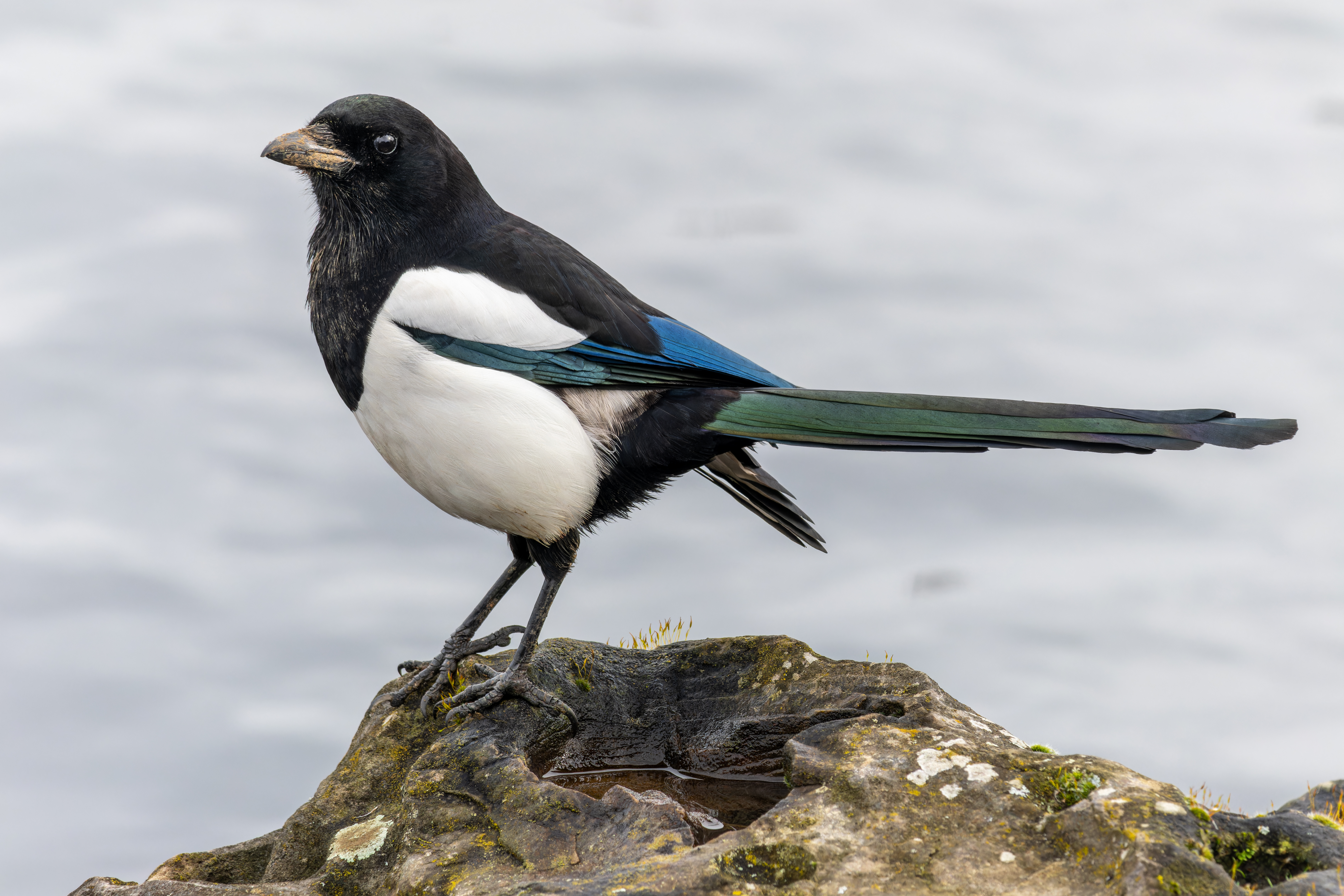
- Nominate subspecies in Gennevilliers, France

Conservation status
- Least Concern (IUCN 3.1)

Scientific classification
- Kingdom: Animalia
- Phylum: Chordata
- Class: Aves
- Order: Passeriformes
- Family: Corvidae
- Genus: Pica
- Species: P. pica

Binomial name
- Pica pica (Linnaeus, 1758)

Subspecies
- See text
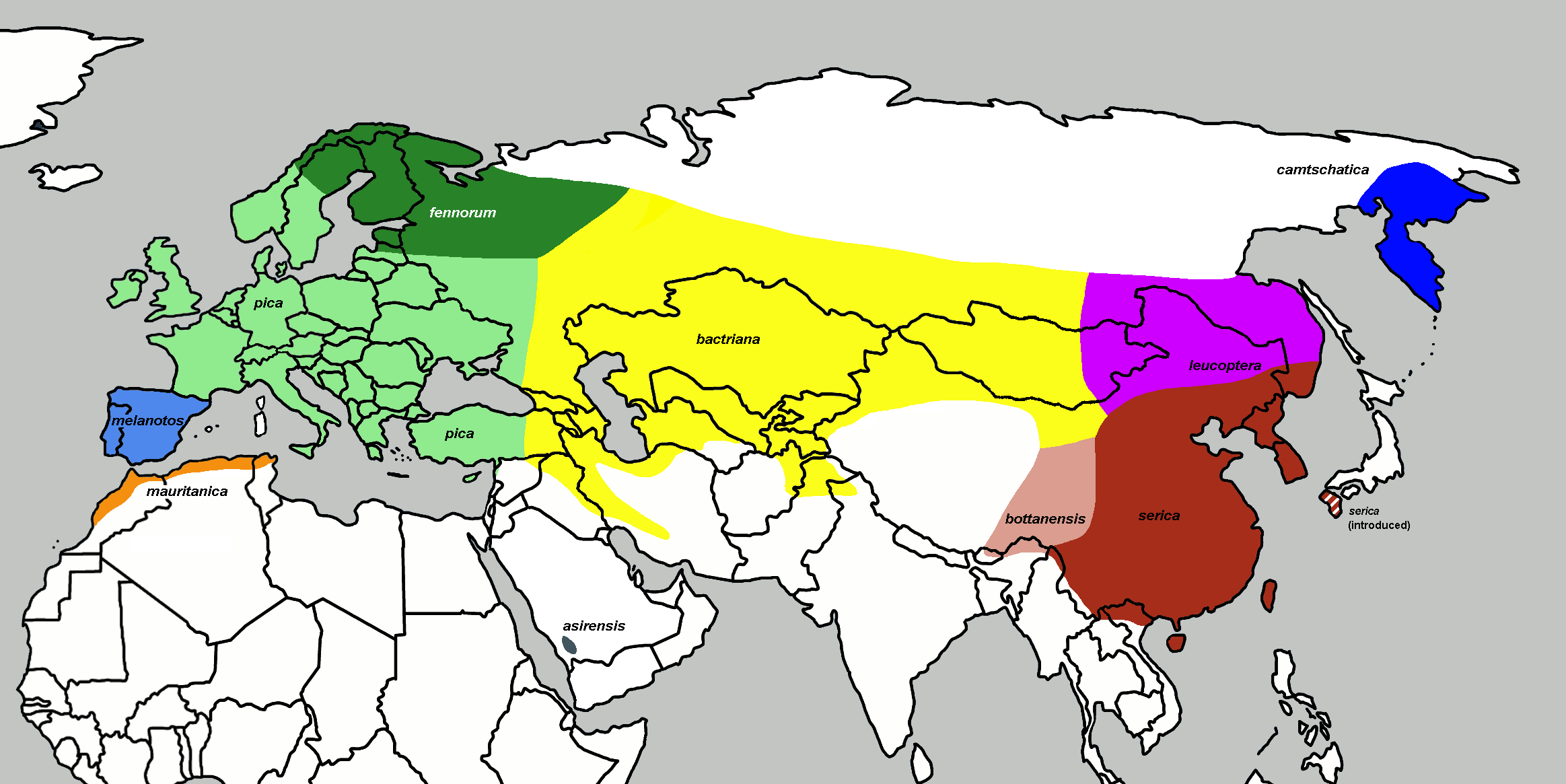
- Global range of the Eurasian magpie and other Afro-Eurasian Pica species. Light blue: Pica pica melanotos Light green: Pica pica pica Dark green: Pica pica fennorum Yellow: Pica pica bactriana Magenta: Pica pica leucoptera Dark blue: Pica pica camtschatica Now treated as separate species: Orange: Maghreb magpie (Pica mauritanica); Dark grey: Asir magpie (Pica asirensis); Light red: Black-rumped magpie (Pica bottanensis); Dark red: Oriental magpie (Pica serica)

Synonyms
- Corvus pica Linnaeus, 1758

= Eurasian magpie =

Eurasian magpie Temporal range: Middle Pleistocene – Recent

Species of bird

The Eurasian magpie or common magpie (Pica pica) is a resident breeding bird throughout the northern part of the Eurasian continent. It is one of several birds in the crow family (corvids) that are designated as magpies, and it belongs to the Holarctic radiation of "monochrome" magpies. In Europe, the term "magpie" is used by English speakers as a synonym for the Eurasian magpie, the only other species of magpie in Europe being the Iberian magpie (Cyanopica cooki), which is restricted to the Iberian Peninsula. Despite sharing a name and similar colouration, they are not closely related to the Australian magpie, which is an artamid, only sharing the same clade (Corvides).

The Eurasian magpie is one of the most intelligent birds. The expansion of its nidopallium is approximately the same in its relative size as the brains of chimpanzees, gorillas, orangutans and humans. It is one of the few bird species known to pass the mirror test.

== Taxonomy and systematics ==
The magpie was first described and illustrated by the Swiss naturalist Conrad Gessner in his Historiae animalium of 1555. In 1758, Linnaeus included the species in the 10th edition of his Systema Naturae under the binomial name Corvus pica. The magpie was moved to a separate genus Pica by the French zoologist Mathurin Jacques Brisson in 1760. Pica is the Classical Latin word for this magpie.

The Eurasian magpie is near-identical in appearance to the North American black-billed magpie (Pica hudsonia) and at one time the two species were considered to be conspecific; as Pica pica (1758) predated Pica hudsonia (1823), this name is used when the two were combined in one species. In 2000, the American Ornithologists' Union decided to treat the black-billed magpie as a separate species based on studies of the vocal and other behaviour indicating that the black-billed magpie was closer to the yellow-billed magpie (Pica nuttalli) than to the Eurasian magpie.

The gradual clinal variation over a large geographic range and the intergradation of the different subspecies means that the geographical limits, and acceptance of these various subspecies vary between authorities. The International Ornithological Congress recognises six subspecies (a seventh, P. p. hemileucoptera, is included in P. p. bactriana):

- P. p. fennorum – Lönnberg, 1927: northern Scandinavia and northwest Russia
- P. p. pica – (Linnaeus, 1758): British Isles and southern Scandinavia east to Russia, south to Mediterranean, including most islands
- P. p. melanotos – A.E. Brehm, 1857: Iberian Peninsula
- P. p. bactriana – Bonaparte, 1850: Siberia east to Lake Baikal, south to Caucasus, Iraq, Iran, Central Asia and Pakistan
- P. p. leucoptera – Gould, 1862: southeast Russia and northeast China
- P. p. camtschatica – Stejneger, 1884: northern Sea of Okhotsk, and Kamchatka Peninsula in Russian Far East

Others now considered as distinct species:

- P. mauritanica – Malherbe, 1845: North Africa (Morocco, northern Algeria and Tunisia) (now considered a separate species, the Maghreb magpie)
- P. asirensis – Bates, 1936: southwest Saudi Arabia (now considered a separate species, the Asir magpie)
- P. serica – Gould, 1845: east and south China, Taiwan, north Myanmar, north Laos and north Vietnam (now considered a separate species, the Oriental magpie)
- P. bottanensis – Delessert, 1840: west central China (now considered a separate species, the black-rumped magpie)

A study using both mitochondrial and nuclear DNA found that magpies in eastern and northeastern China are genetically very similar to each other, but differ from those in northwestern China and Spain.

=== Etymology ===
Magpies were originally known simply as "pies", derived via French pie from the Latin name pica for the species. It is hypothesised that pica derives from the Proto-Indo-European root *(s)peyk- meaning "woodpecker, magpie, other birds", perhaps to be connected with the more basal root *spey- "long, thin, sharp" in reference to their beaks or perhaps their tails (cf. woodpecker).

The prefix "mag" dates from the 16th century, first attested in English as magot pie in Shakespeare's 1606 play Macbeth but earlier in French as margot la pie in 1573. It may come from the short form of the given name Margaret, which was once used to refer to women in general (as Joe or Jack is used for men today); the pie's call was considered to sound like idle female chatter, and so it came to be called the "Mag pie". "Pie" as a term for the bird dates to the 13th century, and the word "pied", first recorded in 1552, was applied to other birds that resembled the magpie in having black-and-white plumage.

== Description ==
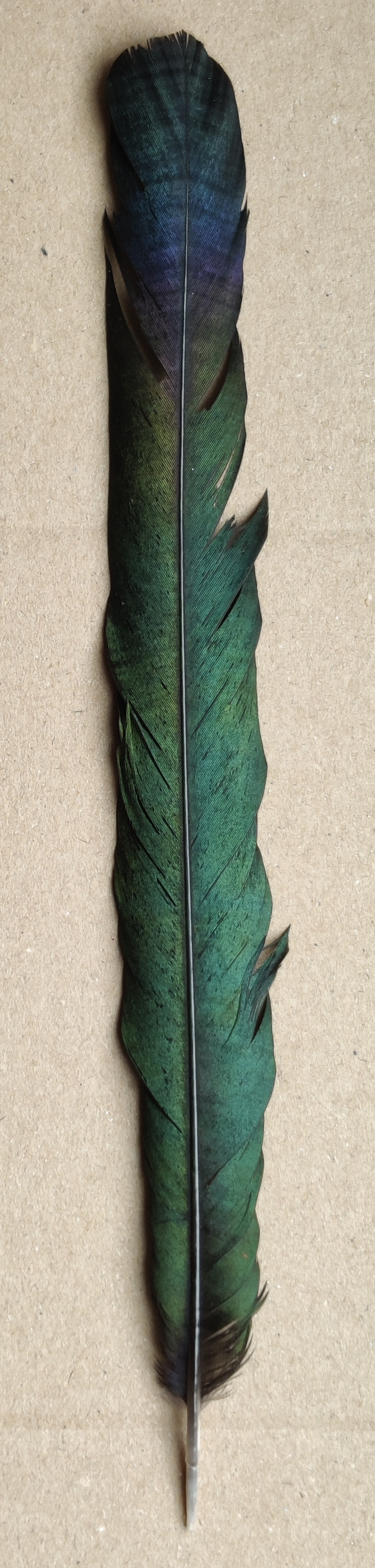
Tail feather

The adult male of the nominate subspecies, P. p. pica, is 44–46 cm (17–18 in) in length, more than half of which is the tail. Its wingspan is 52–62 cm (20–24 in). The head, neck, breast and vent are glossy black with a metallic green and violet sheen; the belly and scapulars (shoulder feathers) are pure white; the wings are black glossed with green or purple, and the primaries have white inner webs, conspicuous when the wing is open. The graduated tail is black, glossed with green and reddish purple. The legs and bill are black; the iris is dark brown. The rump is black with white stripe above which varies in thickness between subspecies. The plumage of the sexes is similar but females are slightly smaller. The tail feathers of both sexes are quite long, about 12–28 cm long. Males of the nominate subspecies weigh 210–272 g (7.4–9.6 oz) while females weigh 182–214 g (6.4–7.5 oz). The young resemble the adults but initially lack the gloss of sooty plumage. They have a pink malar region, and somewhat clear eyes. Their tail is shorter than that of the adults'.

The different subspecies vary in size and in the amount of white in their plumage, as well as in the colour of the gloss on their black feathers. The Asian subspecies P. p. bactriana has more extensive white markings on its primary feathers and a more prominent white rump.

Adults moult completely once a year after breeding. This process begins in June or July and ends in September or October. The primary flight feathers are replaced over a period of three months. Juvenile birds undergo a partial moult, beginning about one month after the adult birds, during which their body feathers are replaced, but not the feathers on their wings or tail.

The Eurasian magpie has a distinctive call. It is either a choking chatter "chac-chac" or a repetitive "chac-chac-chac-chac". The young also make these calls, but they also make an acute "Uik Uik" call that resembles the barking of a small dog. Both adults and young magpies can also produce a barely noticeable hiss from afar.

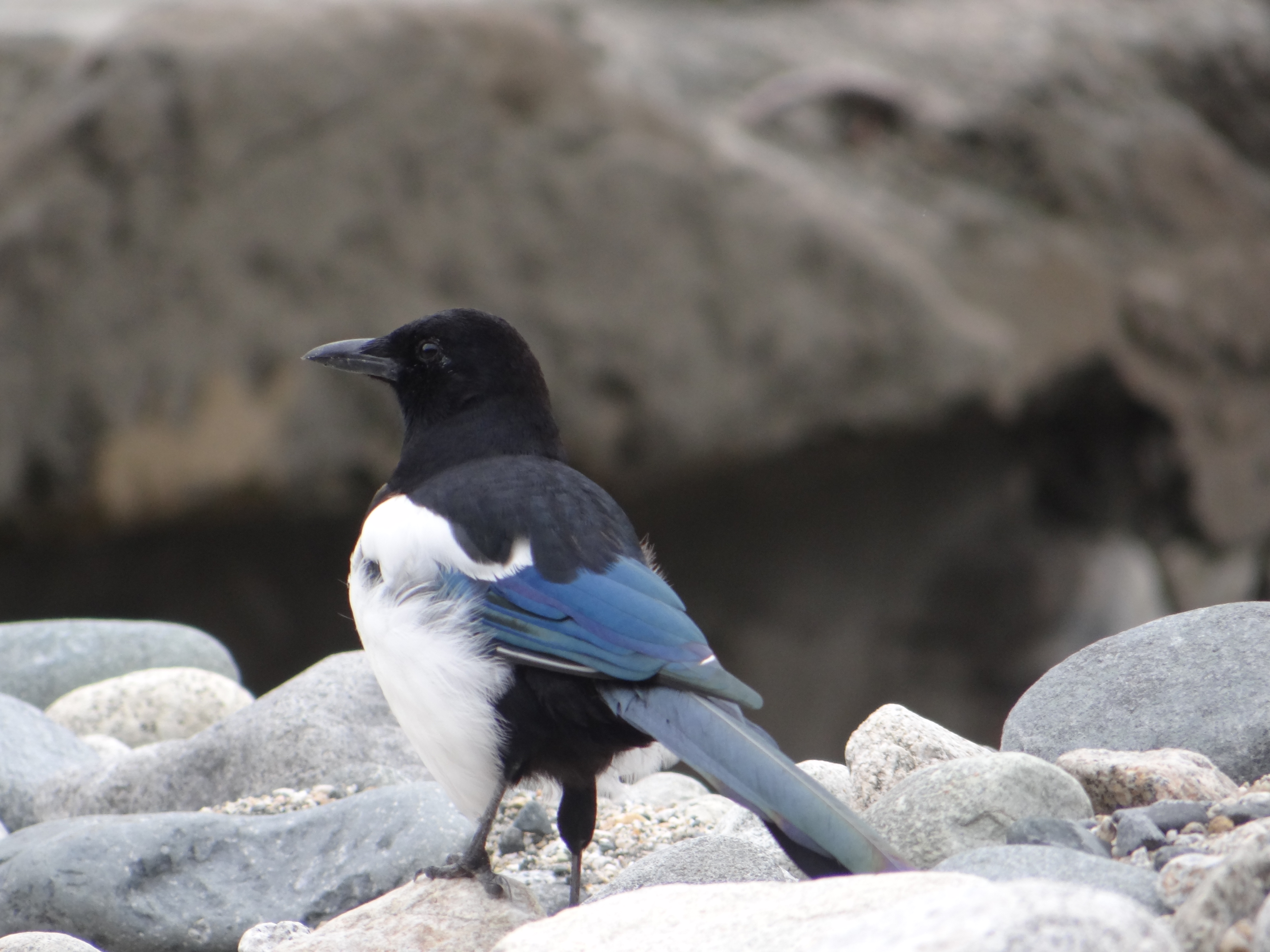
P. p. bactriana in Ladakh

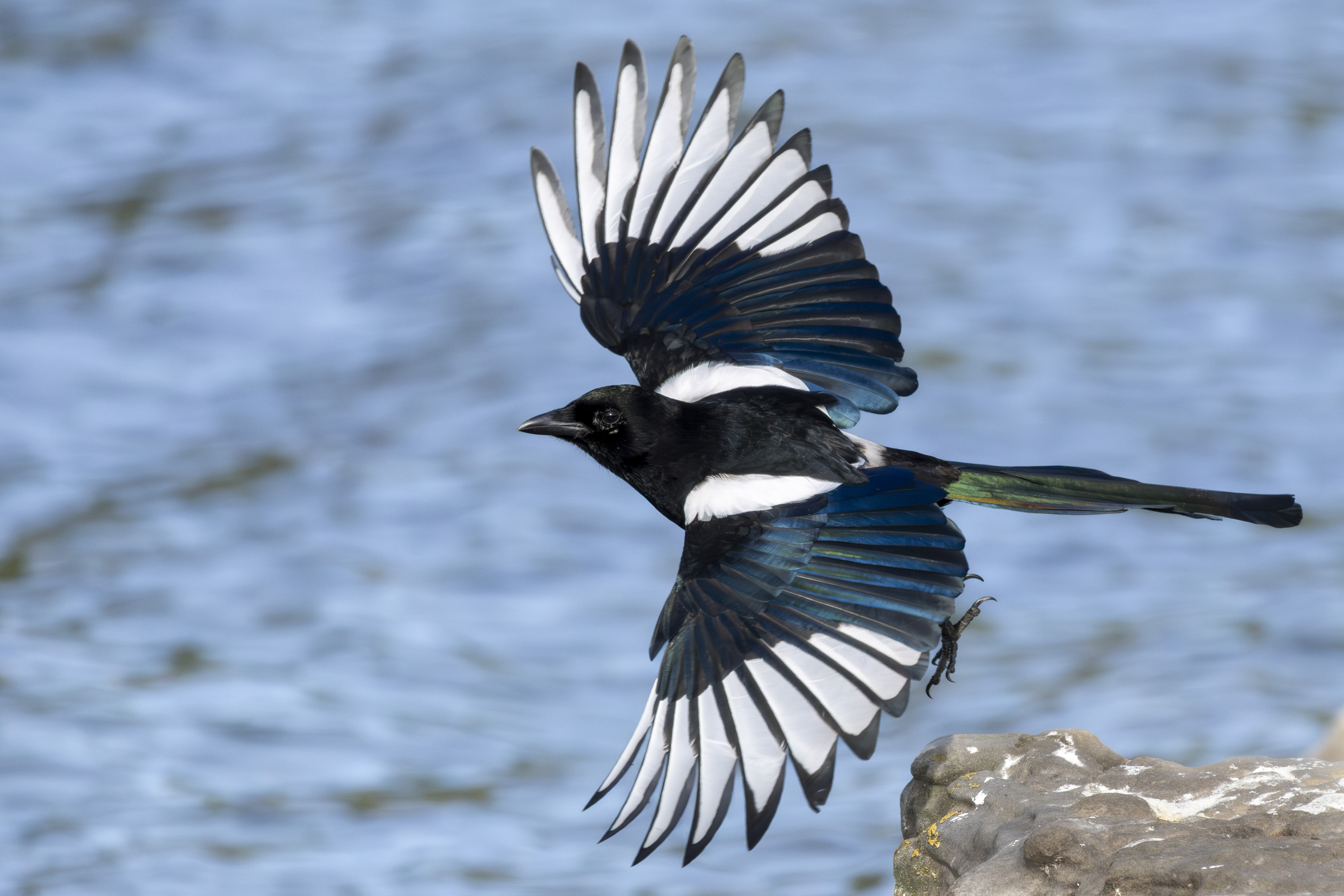
In flight, showing the brightly coloured iridescence on its wing and tail feathers

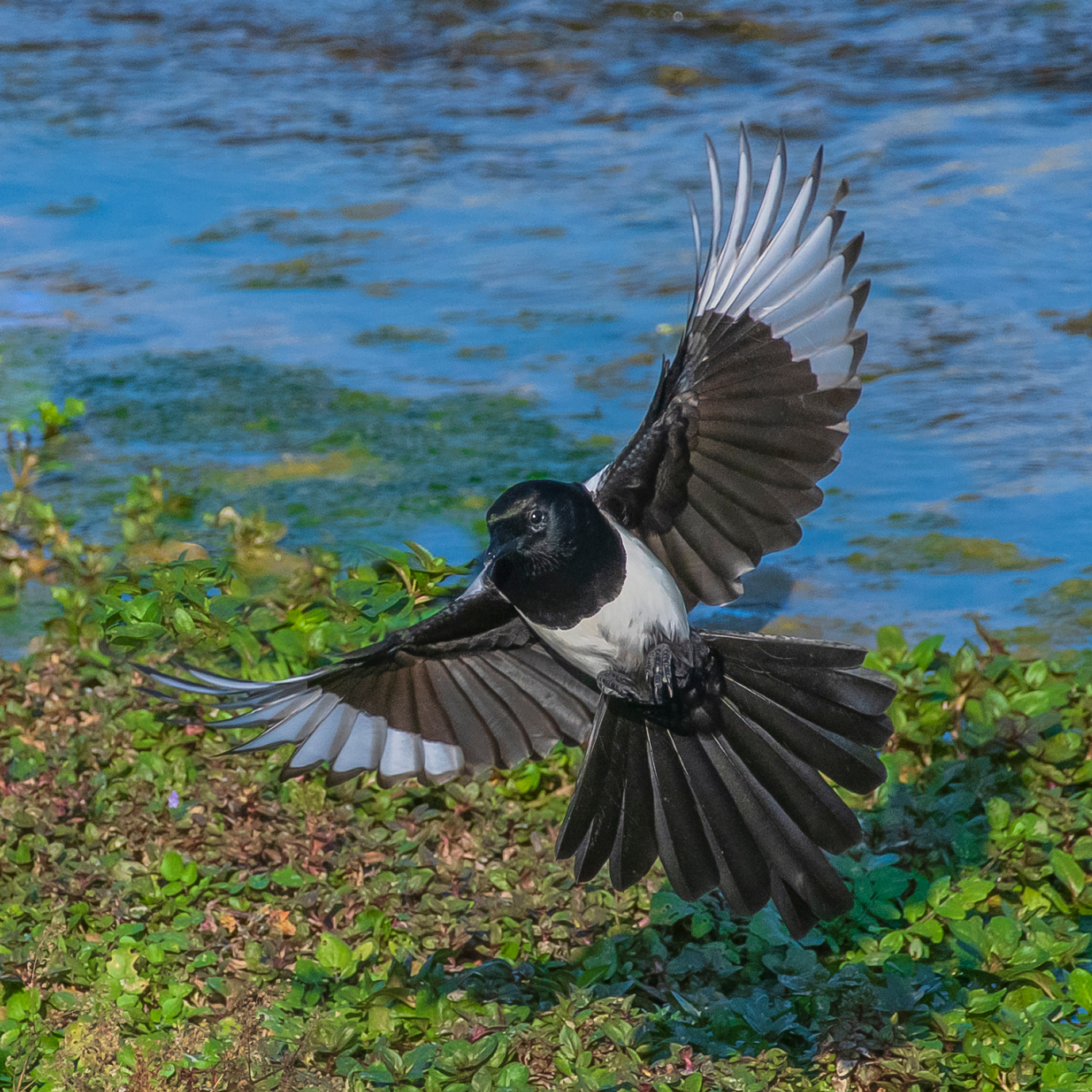
A magpie's underside visible as it prepares to land

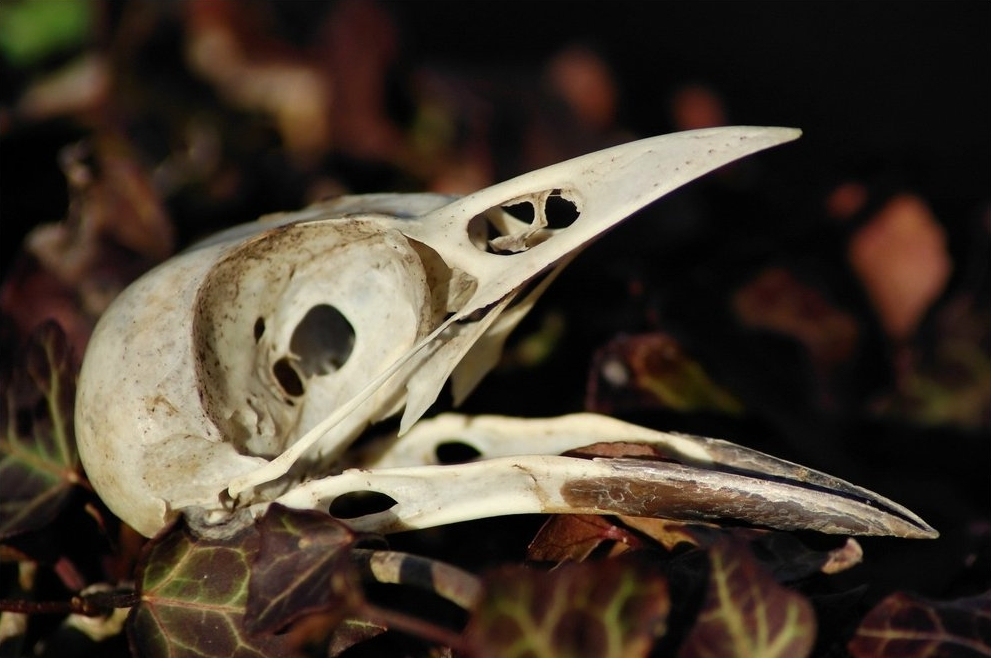
Skull of a Eurasian magpie

== Distribution and habitat ==
The range of the magpie extends across temperate Eurasia from Portugal, Spain and Ireland in the west to the Kamchatka Peninsula in the east.

Magpies prefer open countryside with scattered trees and magpies are normally absent from treeless areas and dense forests. They sometimes breed at high densities in suburban areas such as parks and gardens. They can often be found close to city centres. In Sweden, magpies are exclusively associated with human settlements. It is extremely rare to find a magpie more than a few hundred metres from a human dwelling. Based on archaeological finds, it has been suggested that magpies became scavengers around human communities perhaps as early as during the Scandinavian Bronze Age, but certainly during the Scandinavian Iron Age.

Magpies are usually sedentary and tend to stay close to their nesting territories in winter. However, those living near the northernmost limits of their range, in Sweden, Finland, and Russia, may move south in harsh weather conditions.

In 2023 a Eurasian magpie was seen at Port Fuad in Egypt, the first record for Egypt, having likely arrived on a ship coming from Türkiye or Cyprus headed for the adjacent Suez Canal.

== Behaviour and ecology ==
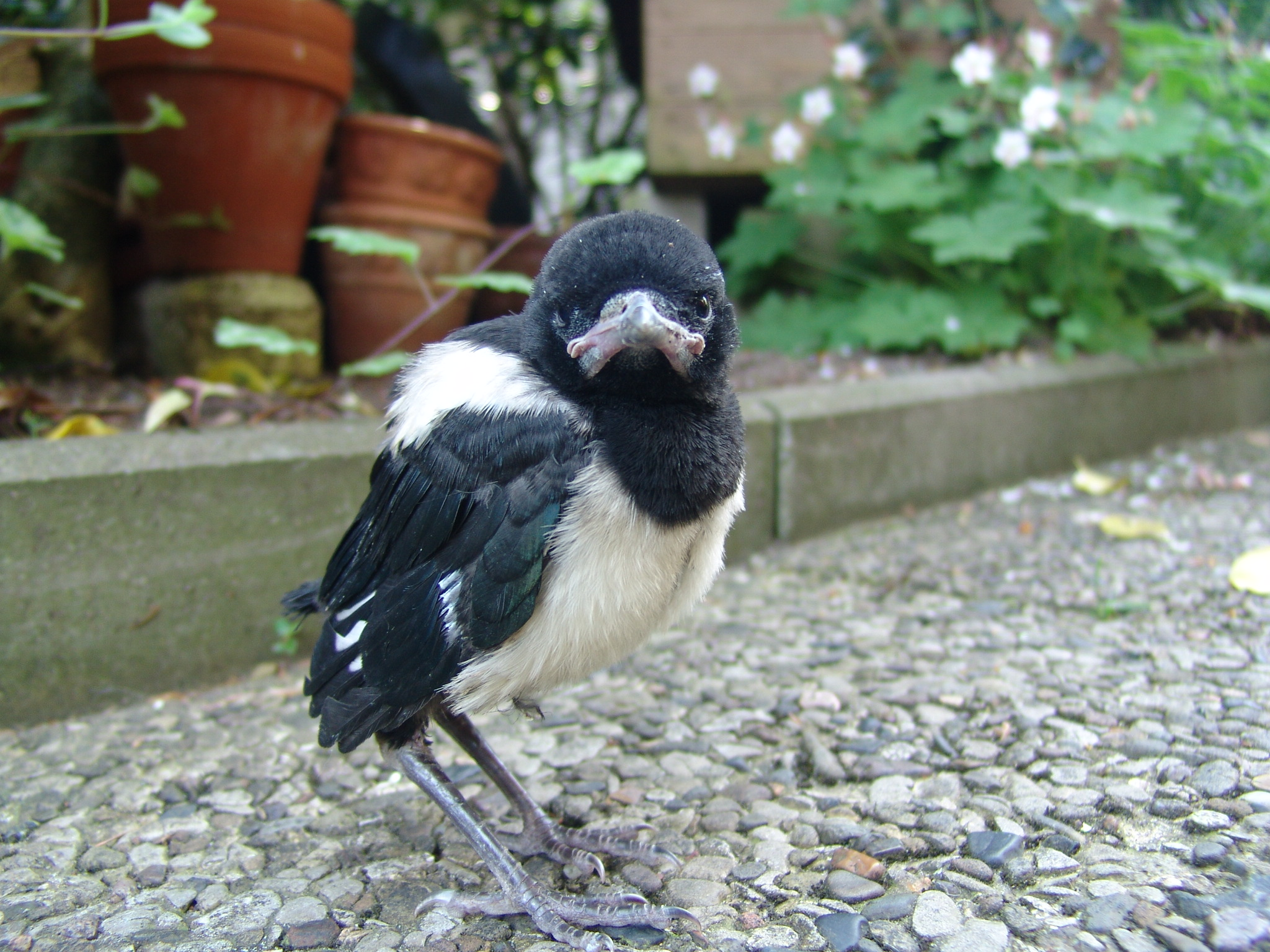
A recently fledged magpie

=== Breeding ===
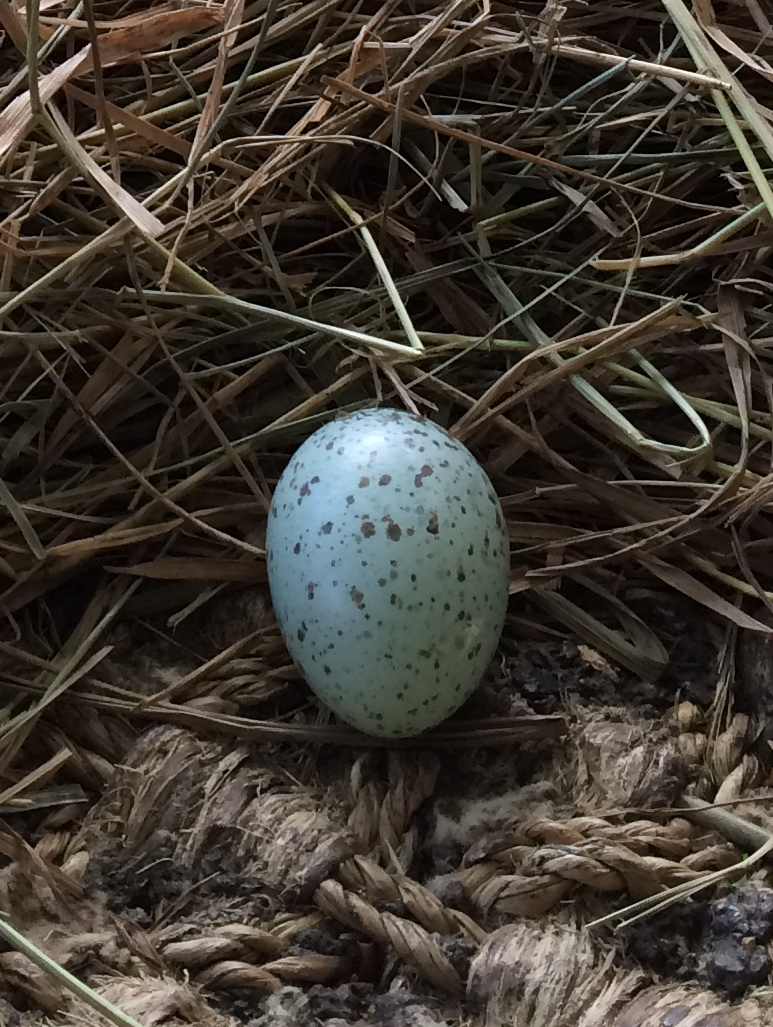
Eurasian magpie egg

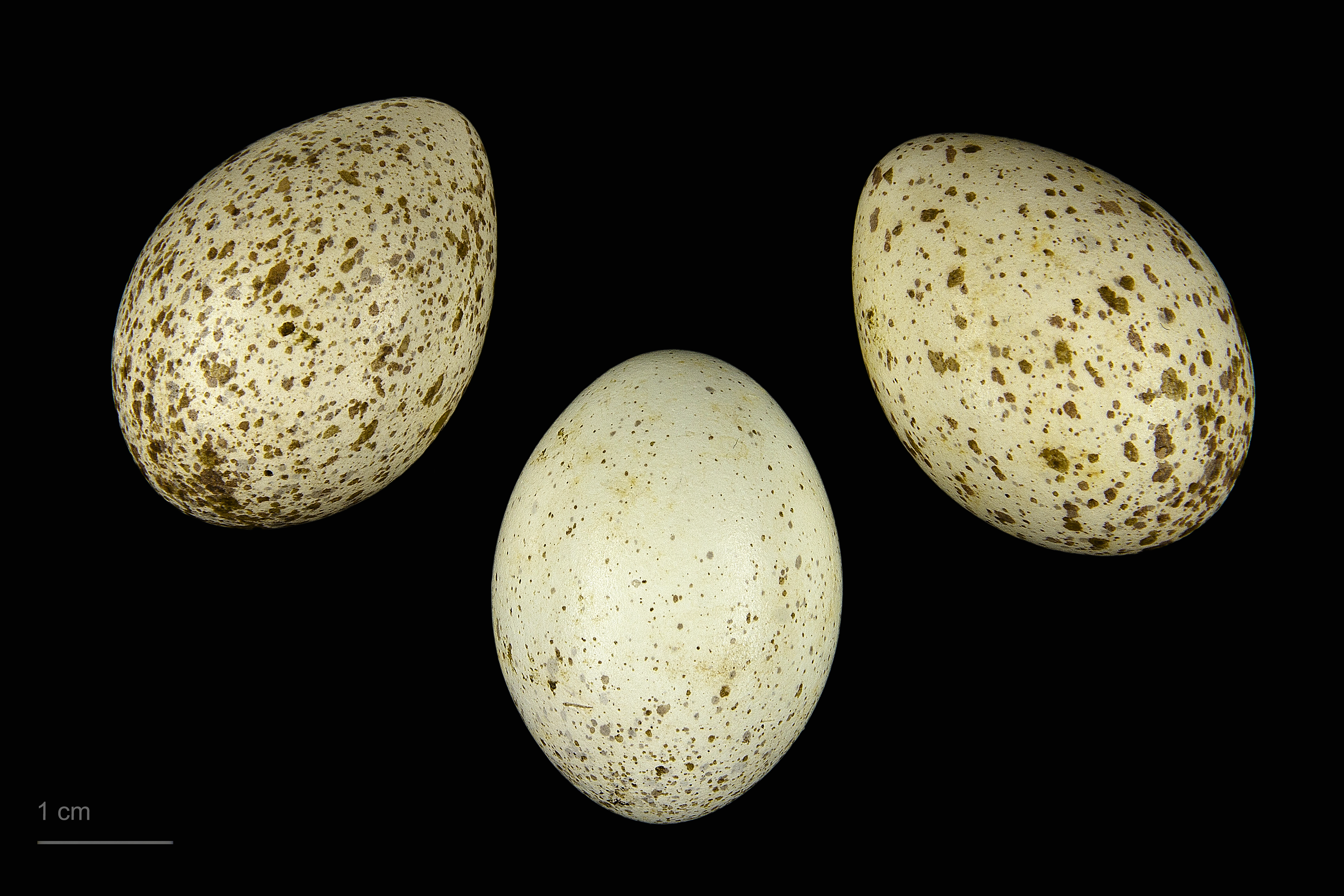
Pica pica pica eggs, Muséum de Toulouse

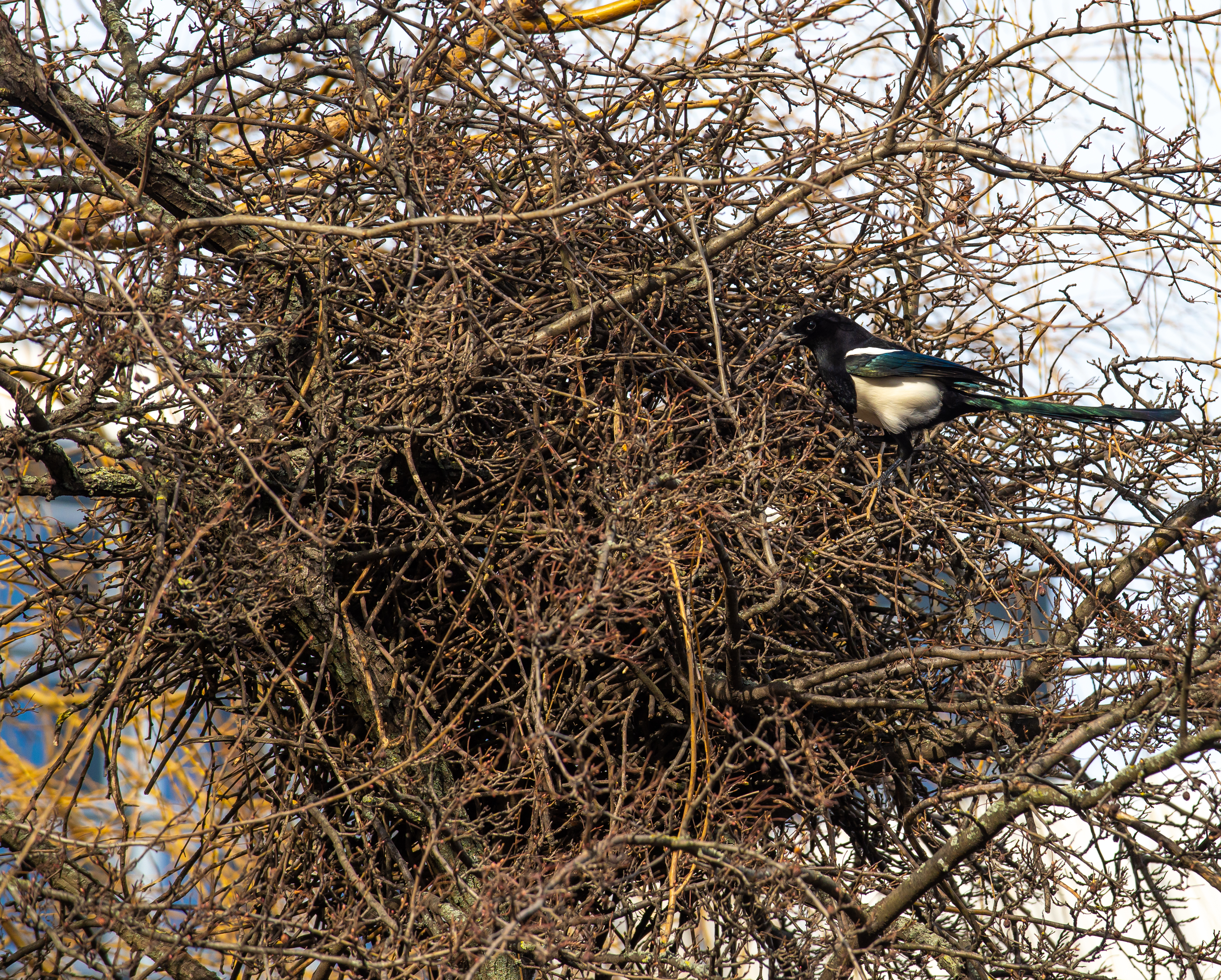
Magpie nest

Some magpies breed after their first year, while others remain in the non-breeding flocks and first breed in their second year. They are monogamous, and the pairs often remain together from one breeding season to the next. They generally occupy the same territory on successive years.

Mating takes place in spring. During the courtship display, the males rapidly raise and lower their head feathers, lift and open their tails like fans, and call in soft tones that are quite distinct from their usual chatter. They bring the loose feathers of their flanks over their primaries and spread their shoulder patch so that the white is conspicuous, presumably to attract females. Short, buoyant flights and chases then follow.

Magpies prefer tall trees in which to build their bulky nests, firmly attaching them to a central fork in the upper branches. The framework of sticks is cemented with earth and clay, and the same material is used for the lining, which is covered with fine roots. Above this is a stout, though loosely built, dome of prickly branches with a single, well-concealed entrance. These huge nests are conspicuous when the leaves fall. Where trees are scarce, however, even in well-wooded areas, nests are sometimes built in bushes and hedgerows.

In 2023, biologists discovered magpie nests made from anti-bird spikes. A nest found in Antwerp, Belgium, now in the collection of Naturalis Biodiversity Center, contains 1500 of these sharp metal spikes, made to deter birds. As they are placed in the dome of the nest to prevent predation of their chicks, they seem to be used in the same way they were intended to be used, to deter other birds.

In Europe, clutches are typically laid in April, and usually contain five or six eggs, though clutches with as few as three or as many as ten have been recorded. The eggs are usually laid at daily intervals in the early morning. On average, the eggs of the nominate species measure 32.9 mm × 23 mm (1.30 in × 0.91 in) and weigh 9.9 g (0.35 oz). Small for the size of the bird, they are typically pale blue-green, with close specks and spots of olive brown, but show much variation in ground colour and markings.

The female incubates the eggs for 21–22 days, while the male feeds her on the nest. The chicks are altricial, hatching nearly naked with closed eyes. They are brooded by the female for the first 5–10 days and fed by both parents. Initially the parents eat the faecal sacs of the nestlings, but as the chicks grow larger, they defecate on the edge of the nest. The nestlings open their eyes seven to eight days after hatching. Their body feathers begin to appear after around eight days, and their primary wing feathers after ten days. For several days before they are ready to leave the nest, the chicks climb around the nearby branches. They fledge at around 27 days. The parents then continue to feed the chicks for several more weeks. They will also protect them from predators as they are unable to fly well, which makes them vulnerable. On average, only three or four chicks survive to fledge successfully. Some nests are lost to predators, but starvation is a more important factor causing nestling mortality. Magpie eggs in a clutch hatch at different times, so if the parents have difficulty finding sufficient food, the last chicks to hatch are unlikely to survive. Only a single brood is reared, unless disaster overtakes the first clutch.

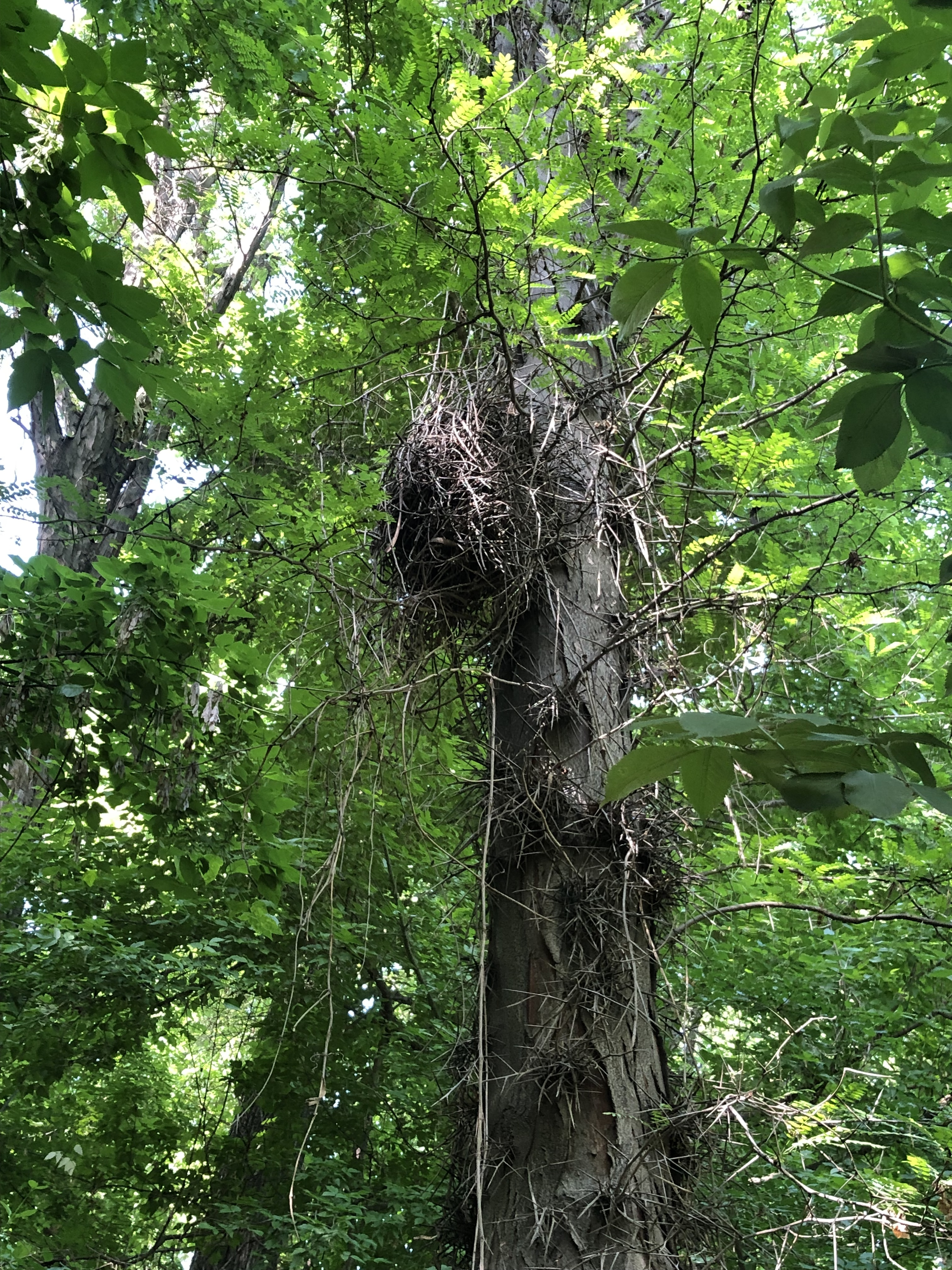
A nest made by Eurasian magpie

A study conducted near Sheffield in Britain, using birds with coloured rings on their legs, found that only 22% of fledglings survived their first year. For subsequent years, the survival rate for the adult birds was 69%, implying that for those birds that survive the first year, the average total lifespan was 3.7 years. The maximum age recorded for a magpie is 21 years and 8 months for a bird from near Coventry in England that was ringed in 1925 and shot in 1947.

=== Feeding ===
The magpie is omnivorous, eating young birds and eggs, small mammals, insects, scraps and carrion, acorns, grain, and other vegetable substances.

=== Roosting of magpies ===
In winter, magpies mostly gather in groups in the evening and roost together. They may also roost alongside other bird species, such as starlings, thrushes, pigeons and western jackdaws.

=== Intelligence ===
Along with other corvids such as ravens, western jackdaws and crows, the Eurasian magpie is believed to be not only among the most intelligent of birds, but also among the most intelligent of all animals. The Eurasian magpie's nidopallium is approximately the same relative size as those in chimpanzees and humans, and significantly larger than those of the gibbons. Their total brain–body mass ratio is equal to most great apes and cetaceans. A 2004 review suggests that the intelligence of the corvid family to which the Eurasian magpie belongs is equivalent to that of the great apes (bonobos, gorillas and orangutans) in terms of social cognition, causal reasoning, flexibility, imagination and prospection.

Magpies have been observed engaging in elaborate social rituals, which may include the expression of grief. Mirror self-recognition has been demonstrated in European magpies, making them one of only a few species known to possess this capability. The cognitive abilities of the Eurasian magpie are regarded as evidence that intelligence evolved independently in both corvids and primates. This is indicated by their use of tools, their ability to hide and store food across seasons, episodic memory, and using their own experience to predict the behaviour of conspecifics. Another behaviour exhibiting intelligence is cutting their food in correctly sized proportions for the size of their young. In captivity, magpies have been observed counting up to get food, imitating human voices, and regularly using tools to clean their own cages. In the wild, they organise themselves into gangs and use complex strategies to hunt other birds and fend off potential predators.

== Status ==
The Eurasian magpie has an extremely large range. It is estimated that there are between 7.5 and 19 million breeding pairs in Europe alone. Allowing for the birds breeding in other continents, the total population is estimated to be between 46 and 228 million individuals. The population trend in Europe has been stable since 1980. There is no evidence of a significant overall decline in numbers. Consequently, the species is classified by the International Union for Conservation of Nature as being of Least Concern.

== Relationship with humans ==
=== Traditions, symbolism, and reputation ===
==== Europe ====
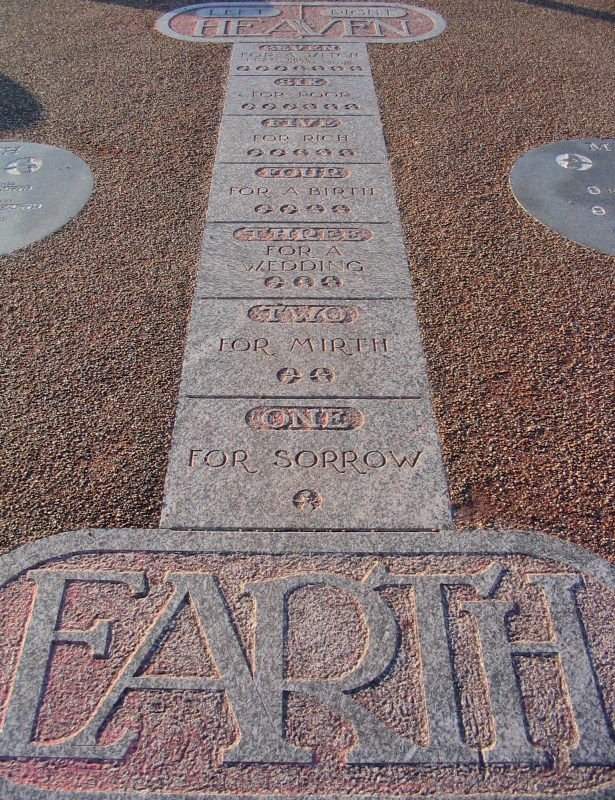
Hopscotch game in England with the magpie rhyme

Magpies have historically been demonised by humans in Europe, mainly as a result of superstition and myth. The bird has found itself in this situation largely through association, says Steve Roud: "Large black birds, like crows and ravens, are viewed as evil in British folklore and white birds are viewed as good". In European folklore, the magpie is associated with a number of superstitions surrounding its reputation as an omen of ill fortune. In the 19th-century book, A Guide to the Scientific Knowledge of Things Familiar, a proverb concerning magpies is recited: "A single magpie in spring, foul weather will bring". The book further explains that this superstition arises from the habits of pairs of magpies to forage together only when the weather is fine. In Scotland, a magpie near the window of the house is said to foretell death. According to an English tradition, greeting a single magpie is said to ward off any bad luck it may bring. A greeting might be something like "Good morning, Mr Magpie, how are Mrs Magpie and all the other little magpies?", and a 19th-century version recorded in Shropshire is to say "Devil, Devil, I defy thee! Magpie, magpie, I go by thee!" and to spit on the ground three times.

In Britain and Ireland, the traditional rhyme "One for Sorrow" records the myth that seeing magpies predicts the future, depending on how many are seen. However, it is not clear whether this myth has ever been taken seriously. There are many regional variations of the rhyme, making it impossible to identify a definitive version.

In Italian, British and French folklore, magpies are believed to have a penchant for picking up shiny items, particularly precious stones or metallic objects. Rossini's opera La gazza ladra and The Adventures of Tintin comic The Castafiore Emerald are based on this theme. However, a recent study has cast doubt on the veracity of this belief. In Bulgarian, Czech, German, Hungarian, Polish, Russian, Slovak and Swedish folklore the magpie is seen as a thief. In Hungary there is an old saying which said when you heard a magpie singing it meant guests would be coming to your house. Perhaps because the magpie loved to sit on the trees in front of the village houses and signaled when a man was approaching.

In Sweden, it is further associated with witchcraft. In Norway, a magpie is considered cunning and thievish, but also the bird of hulder, the underground people.

Magpies have been criticised for their role as predators, which includes eating the eggs and young of other birds, mostly smaller songbirds. However, one study has disputed the view that they affect total song-bird populations, finding "no evidence of any effects of [magpie] predator species on songbird population growth rates. Therefore, there was no indication that predators had a general effect on songbird population growth rates". Another study has claimed that smaller songbird populations increased in areas with high magpie populations, suggesting that magpies do not negatively impact total songbird populations.

== Cited sources ==
- Birkhead, T. R. (1991). The Magpies: The Ecology and Behaviour of Black-billed and Yellow-billed Magpies. T. & A.D. Poyser. ISBN 978-0-85661-067-7.
