= Episodic-like memory =

Memory system in animals

Episodic-like memory is the memory system in animals that is comparable to human episodic memory. The term was first described by Clayton & Dickinson referring to an animal's ability to encode and retrieve information about 'what' occurred during an episode, 'where' the episode took place, and 'when' the episode happened. This ability in animals is considered 'episodic-like' because there is currently no way of knowing whether or not this form of remembering is accompanied by conscious recollection—a key component of Endel Tulving's original definition of episodic memory.

== Distinction from human episodic memory ==
In order for an animal's memory to qualify as 'episodic-like,' it must meet three behavioural criteria reflecting the content, structure and flexibility of the memory. Content refers to recalling what happened, where it happened, and when it happened on the basis of a specific past experience. Structure refers to forming an integrated what-where-when representation, and flexibility refers to being able to use the information in a versatile way. In order for an animal to meet these behavioural criteria then, they must be able to not only form what-where-when memories, but integrate the what, where and when of the event into an integrated framework. The assessment of episodic-like memory must rely on these behavioural characteristics because animals do not have the language capabilities to participate in the episodic memory tests developed for humans.

Evidence of an episodic-like memory system was first provided by Clayton & Dickinson (1998). They demonstrated that western scrub jays (Aphelocoma californica) remember where they cache different types of food, and discriminately recover them depending on the perishability of the item and the amount of time that has passed since caching. Recent research has further investigated episodic-like memory in these birds, but has also explored evidence of this memory system in other species such as the rufous hummingbird, pigeons, primates, rats and honeybees.

The overall organization and brain structures involved in human episodic memory have also been compared to what exists in the animal brain. Many similarities have been found including the role of the medial temporal lobe, a structure including the hippocampus. Nonetheless, many have cautioned making comparisons to human episodic memory. Many criticisms of this area of research have been made including questioning how accurately we can attain this information simply based on behavioural criteria and non verbal tests.

== Neural mechanisms ==
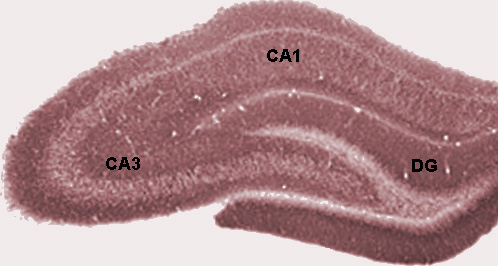
Subdivisions of the hippocampus in a rat brain. Information is projected through a path which begins with the dentate gyrus (DG), then to area CA3, CA1, and finally to the subiculum.

The ability to encode and retrieve past experiences relies on the circuitry of the medial temporal lobe, a brain structure that includes the hippocampus and other para-hippocampal cortical areas. The organization of these brain areas is largely conserved across mammalian species as are the major pathways that information travels between the medial temporal lobe and the neocortex. Because of this strong parallel between animal brain structures and the structures involved in human episodic memory, there is reason to believe that not only do some animals possess the ability to form what-where-when memories, but that this episodic-like system may be more comparable to human episodic memory than once thought.

According to Eichenbaum (2000), information that is projected from nearly all neocortical areas come together onto one or more subdivisions of the para-hippocampal region which includes the perirhinal cortex, the postrhinal cortex and the entorhinal cortex. This information is then projected onto subdivisions of the hippocampus which are connected by a path which begins with the dentate gyrus, continuing to area CA3, then CA1, and finally through to the subiculum. Information is then directed back to the para-hippocampal region and finally to the same areas of the cerebral cortex that were the source of input to this region. This organization has been observed in primates, rats, and other mammalian species.

The hippocampus in particular has an evolutionarily well conserved structure. It contains similar cell types and comparable structural design in humans and non-human primates. Its structure in rodents is also remarkably similar although in rodents it contains approximately ten times fewer cells and more connections between hemispheres.

Animal lesion studies have also provided evidence related to the importance of particular brain structures in episodic-like memory. Rats with medial prefrontal cortical lesions showed impairment on the 'where' component suggesting that this area contributed to retrieving information on object location. Similarly, hippocampal lesions severely impacted all three components (what, where, and when) suggesting that the hippocampus is responsible for detecting new events, stimuli, and places when forming new memories and on retrieving that information later on.

== Research ==
=== Western scrub jays (Aphelocoma californica) ===
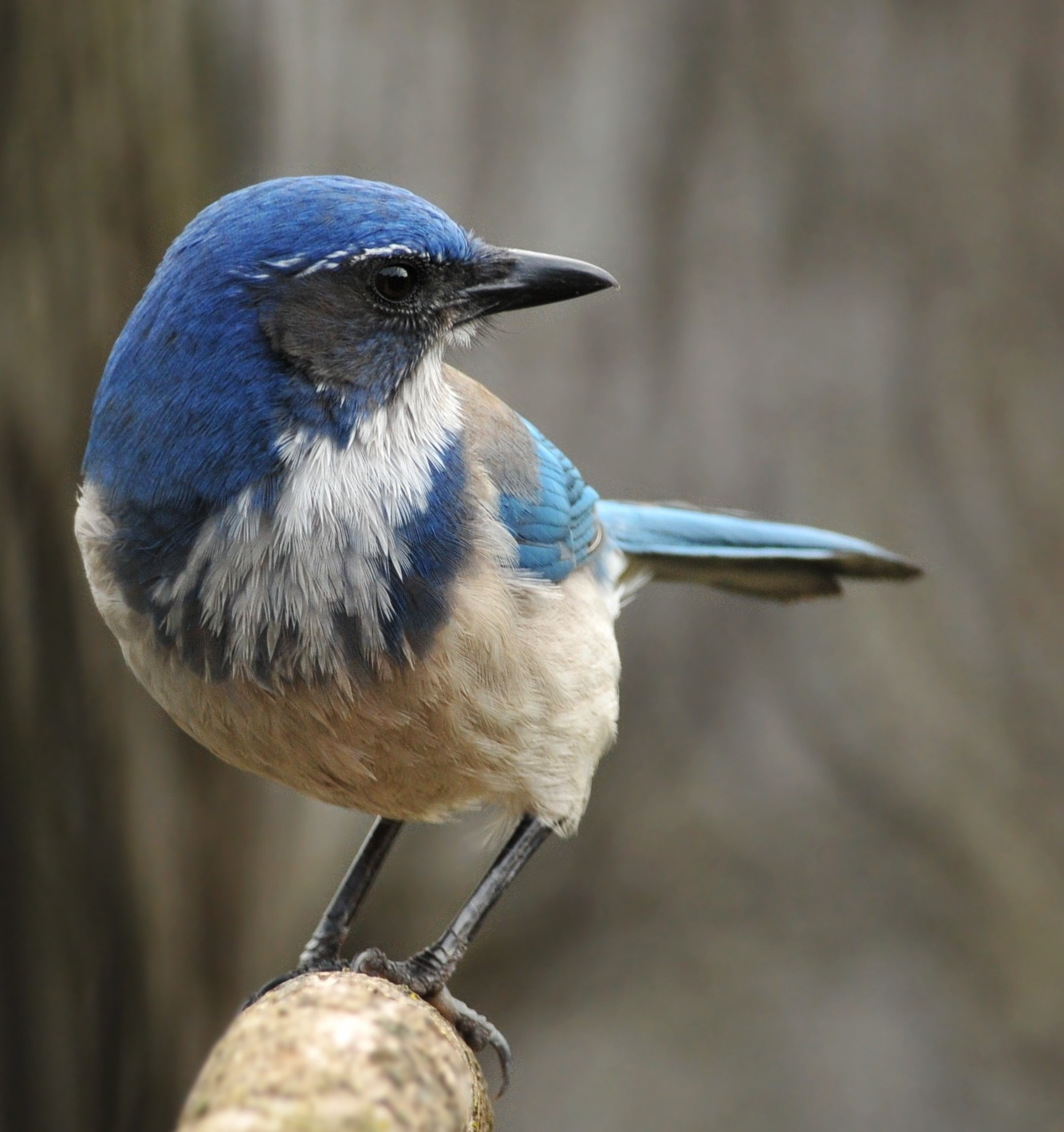
Episodic-like memory was first demonstrated in the western scrub jay (Aphelocoma californica).

Recent research regarding mental time travel and episodic-like memory has focused on determining whether there are any non-human animals that demonstrate future planning and under what conditions they do so. One species that has frequently been considered is the western scrub jay (Aphelocoma californica), a member of the corvid family of birds native to western North America. These large-brained, long-lived, and highly social birds hide food caches for future consumption and rely on memory to recover their caches of hidden food at a later date, typically weeks if not months into the future. They show an ability to form what-where-when memories characteristic of episodic memory as they remember the spatial location and contents of their caches as well as recalling which conspecifics were watching during caching.

Flexibility within episodic-like memory has been demonstrated within a study by Clayton et al. involving the caching of perishable and non-perishable foods. The jays were allowed to cache perishable and non-perishable items but then discovered, in the interval between caching and recovery, that the perishable food type degraded more quickly than originally thought. They reasoned that, if the birds do use a flexible declarative memory system, they should be able to update their knowledge about the rate of perishability of the food and change their search behaviour at recovery accordingly, even though the episodic information about what they cached where and when was encoded before gaining the new knowledge about the decay rates. Results confirmed this reasoning demonstrating that these birds possess a flexible episodic like memory system where they can update their information after the time of encoding.

An experiment conducted by Dally et al. examined the importance of social living in scrub jays by testing whether storer birds remember the status of the observer bird who watched them during caching – adding a 'who' to the what-where-when memory framework. They found that, as predicted, storer birds' adjusted their behaviour during the initial caching period according to the rank of the observer bird. In the dominant observer bird condition, where they experienced the highest risk of cache theft, storers cached predominantly in the tray farthest away from the observer bird and recached the greatest proportion of items during the recovery period. In a second part of this study, they tested whether scrub jays remember which particular individual was present when they made specific caches. Birds cached in front of observer birds as they did the first part of this study, but then hours later were separated into three conditions where they either recovered their caches in private, in front of an observer bird that watched them cache initially, or in front of a new control bird. They found that the proportion of caches that were recached at recovery differed significantly between conditions and significantly more caches were recached during the observed condition relative to the control condition. This suggests that during the recovery stage, storer birds remember whether the observer bird watching them recover their cache was the same bird who watched them cache initially and engage in additional behaviours to prevent cache theft.

=== Hummingbirds ===
A study of the rufous hummingbird found they were able to learn and remember which flowers in an arrangement contained a nectar reward. Although visual cues such as the type and colour of flower increased how quickly the locations were learned, they weren't necessary for learning. Hummingbirds could remember that only the center flower contained a reward even in arrangements of identical flowers. Artificial flowers were created using small cardboard disks painted in unique colours, the center of which contained a syringe tip filled with a small amount of sucrose solution. When spacing between the flowers was increased, hummingbirds still remembered the relative locations of the flowers in arrangement. When the arrangements of artificial flowers were moved, the hummingbirds remembered which flowers contained nectar, even when the new location of the arrangement placed an empty flower in the location previously occupied by a reward flower.

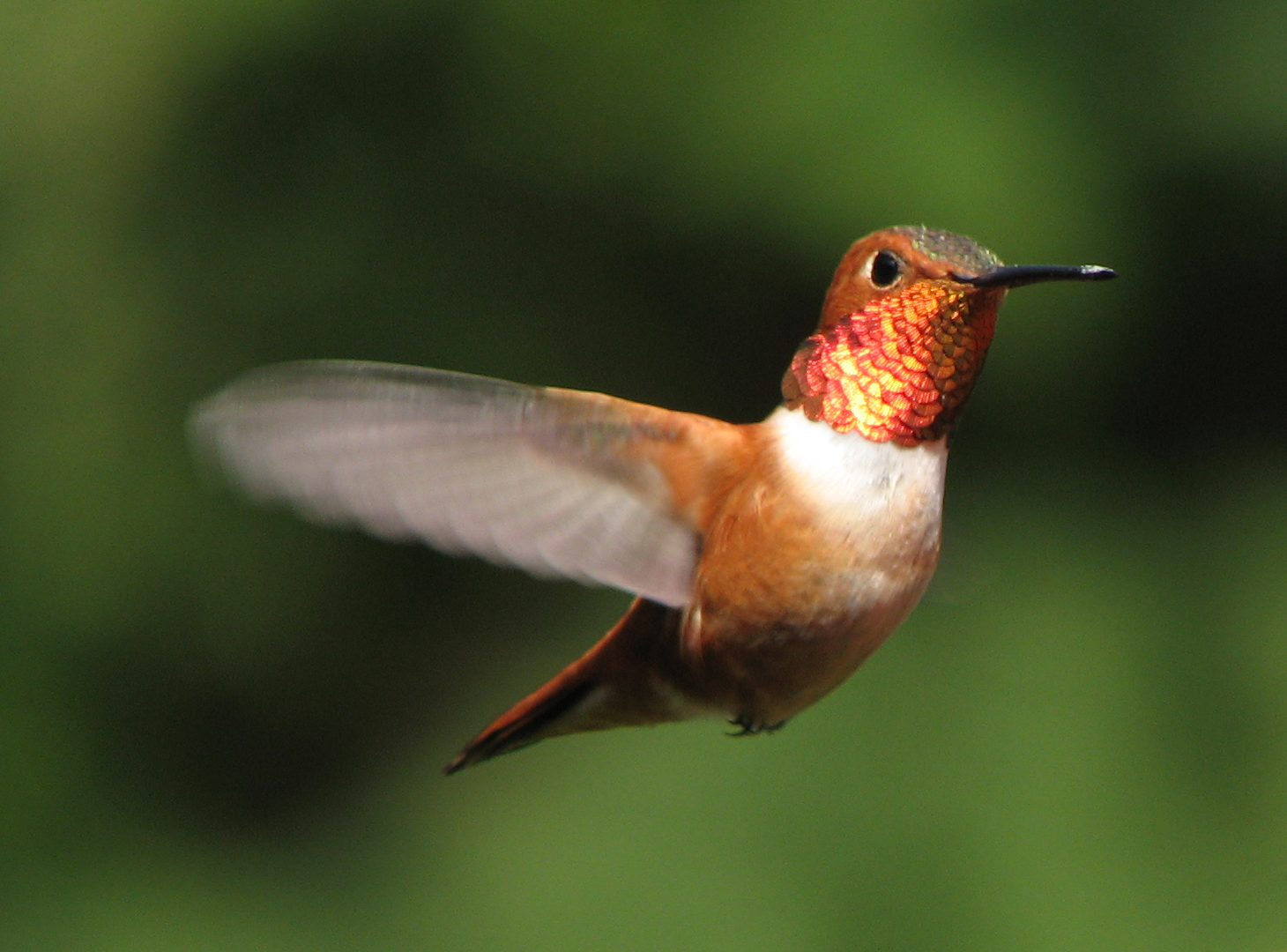
Hummingbirds demonstrate the ability to recall where certain flowers were located and how recently they were visited.

Rufous hummingbirds are also able to adjust their foraging strategies based on when they've last visited flowers and how often the flower's nectar is renewed. Artificial flowers were refilled in either ten- or twenty-minute intervals upon being emptied. The hummingbirds were able to distinguish between the types of flower and adjust their foraging strategies accordingly. Over time the hummingbirds learned the schedule of renewal and visited the flowers renewed every ten minutes much more frequently than the flowers renewed every twenty minutes. This implies planning on the part of the hummingbird in order to avoid redundant trips and avoid wasting energy. Similar cognitive abilities and foraging strategies were also observed in a study of the green-backed firecrown, another species of hummingbird.

=== Pigeons ===
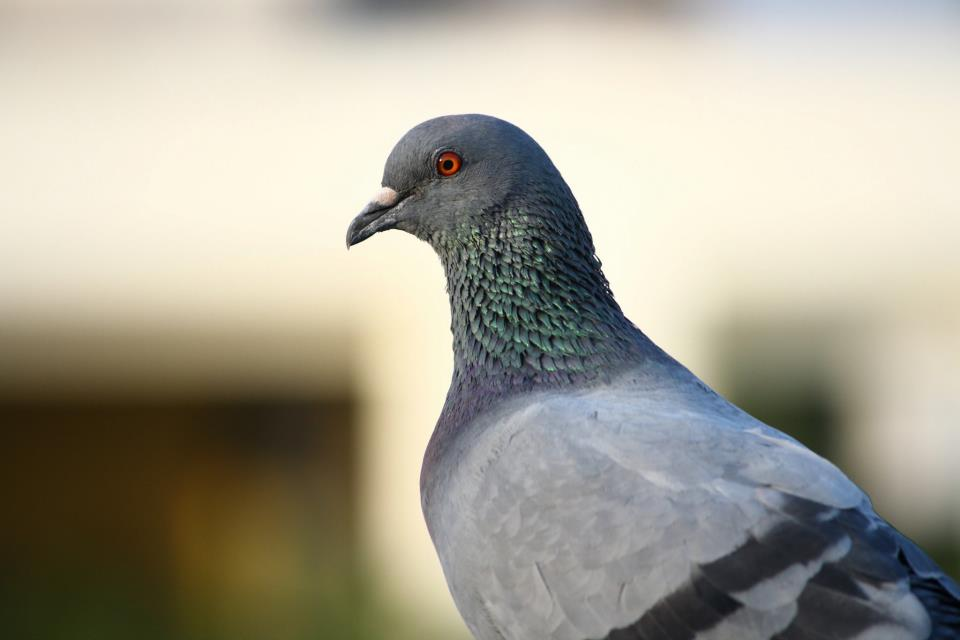
Pigeons have been shown to think back on past experience to generate positive future outcomes.

The pigeon has also been shown to exhibit qualities similar to episodic-like memory. Pigeons respond to a stimulus shown before the presentation of food by thereafter pecking future examples of the stimulus. In the event that a stimulus is presented without food, pigeons will choose not to peck at future presentations of the stimulus. A study at the University of Kentucky aimed to determine whether pigeons could recall their previous actions with regard to certain hues presented either with or without food. The first phase of the experiment involved training the pigeons to peck in response to one stimulus (vertical lines) and refrain from pecking for at least four seconds in response to another stimulus (horizontal lines). The presented stimuli were then followed by both a red and green key. Pecking the green key following a pecking stimulus (vertical lines) resulted in a food reward, as did pecking the red stimulus following a non-pecking stimulus (horizontal lines). This allowed the experimenters to effectively pose questions to the pigeons on their past actions. The pigeons were required to recall what the previous stimulus had been and how they had reacted in order to formulate a correct response and receive a reward.

This differs from other memory tasks where the aim was simply to determine whether a stimulus and response could be paired as a learned association and then testing the memory for that association. This experiment showed a clear use of episodic memory or a similar construct, pigeons were shown to think back on past experience to generate a positive future outcome.

=== Primates ===
Due to their similarities to humans, researchers have been interested in looking into the episodic memory abilities of non-human primates. However, little uncriticized research has previously been done. For example, Schwartz performed an experiment with gorillas in a task requiring the animal to select the appropriate card that represented the food he had just eaten and who had given it to him. While the gorilla appropriately identified the food items and trainer, it is unclear if he recalled the event or chose the answer most familiar to him. Menzel also showed evidence of episodic memory in apes, however, an alternative explanation is that the chimpanzees were displaying spatial semantic memory. Furthermore, Hampton had mixed results when testing rhesus monkeys; while demonstrating memory for the location and type of food, they lacked sensitivity to when they acquired the knowledge. Thus, more research was required for this type of memory in non-human primates.

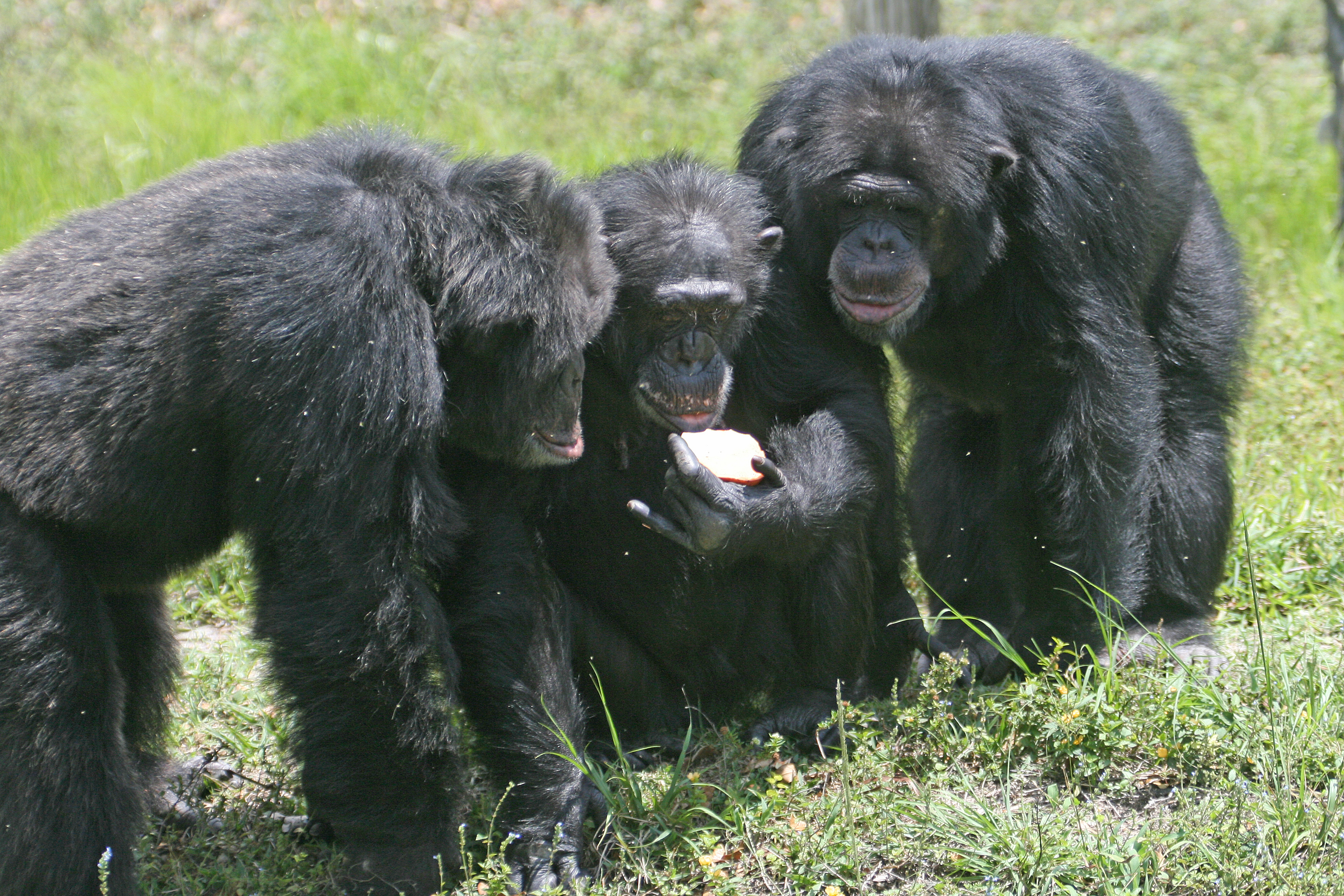
Humans and primates may possess some of the same information encoding and storage mechanisms related to episodic memory.

Chimpanzees and orangutans were tested using an adapted design by Clayton and colleagues for experimenting with scrub jays. After five minutes and again at one hour, the apes were presented with the choice of selecting hidden frozen juice, less-preferred grapes, or an empty platform. While the juice was the preferred item, it would melt before the hour. Subjects were both male and female. Food item placement was changed during multiple trials so that the study was not accidentally measuring familiarity. The primates rarely chose the empty platform, and after five minutes preferred the juice solution over the grape. After an hour, while a smaller number of primates chose the juice, the majority of apes still reached for melted juice.

The study also wanted to compare human and primate performance on the task to show episodic memory. Humans exhibit age-dependent performance with inverted U-shaped results, meaning ability increases in childhood, stabilizes for a few years and then descends as adulthood progresses. The similarities in findings found may indicate these primates and humans share some information encoding and storage mechanisms. Future research may be done with a larger sample size and different experiments to replicate the inverted U-shape findings.

=== Fruit bats ===
Most examples of episodic-like memory are based on animals in captivity, however a study on free-foraging Egyptian fruit bats (Rousettus aegyptiacus) has found evidence for planning of foraging based on both their knowledge of the location and availability of food, but also temporal understanding of food tree seasonality. This study conducted two experiments.

The first explored 'time-mapping' (i.e., whether bats track time since they last visited a tree). The authors hypothesised that if bats had the ability to keep track of time they would revisit different tree species at different frequencies after periods of captivity of different durations (i.e., that they would not visit short-fruiting trees after long periods in captivity, as they would likely no longer provide food). Results from the study showed that this prediction was true, but, interestingly, only in 'experienced' bats (those that had greater experience to the outdoors prior to the experiment).

The second experiment investigated 'future planning'. Throughout the study a bowl of fruit was placed at the colony at the beginning of every evening; some bats ignore this offering and leave the roost early in the evening, whereas others choose to feed from the bowl first. As the bats that left early would likely be seeking water, and the bats that fed and left later would likely be seeking protein, the authors hypothesised that the bats that left at different times would display different food choices if they had the capacity for 'future planning'. 15 bats were tracked for an average of 45 nights each. The results showed that bats that left the colony early visited trees with higher water content in their fruit first, and that those that left late first sought trees with protein-rich fruit. The authors argue that this shows that the bats choose what to eat, and where to fly, before leaving the roost.

=== Rats ===
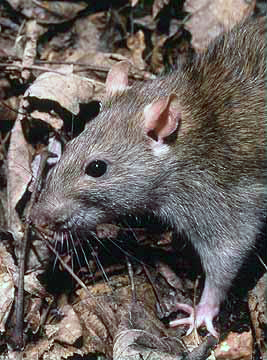
Rats demonstrate the ability to discriminate based on the what, where, and when components of episodic-like memory.

A study by Babb and Crystal (2005) provided evidence that rats also demonstrate the ability to discriminate based on what, where, and when. In experiments using a radial arm maze, four of the eight arms of the maze contained food. The other arms were made inaccessible to the rats. Of the food containing corridors of the maze, three contained standard rat-chow pellets while one arm contained high value chocolate-flavoured pellets. This was the first phase of the experiment, defined as the forced-choice phase (some corridors were inaccessible). The second phase was defined as the free-choice phase (all corridors were now accessible to the rats). The period of time between each phase served as a discriminating cue. Some days the interval between phases would be short (30 minutes) other days the interval would be long (4 hours), but only one type of interval was tested each day. On days when a short interval was used, the previously inaccessible corridors were made accessible and were the only corridors to contain regular pellets and no chocolate pellets were refilled. On days using a long interval, pellets were refilled as on short interval days, but in addition, the chocolate pellets were refilled in the location they had originally been found. The rats were able to discriminate based on the length of interval before the test phase, with the phases following a long interval having the rats immediately search in the arm of the maze associated with the location of the high value (chocolate-flavoured) pellets.

=== Honey Bees ===
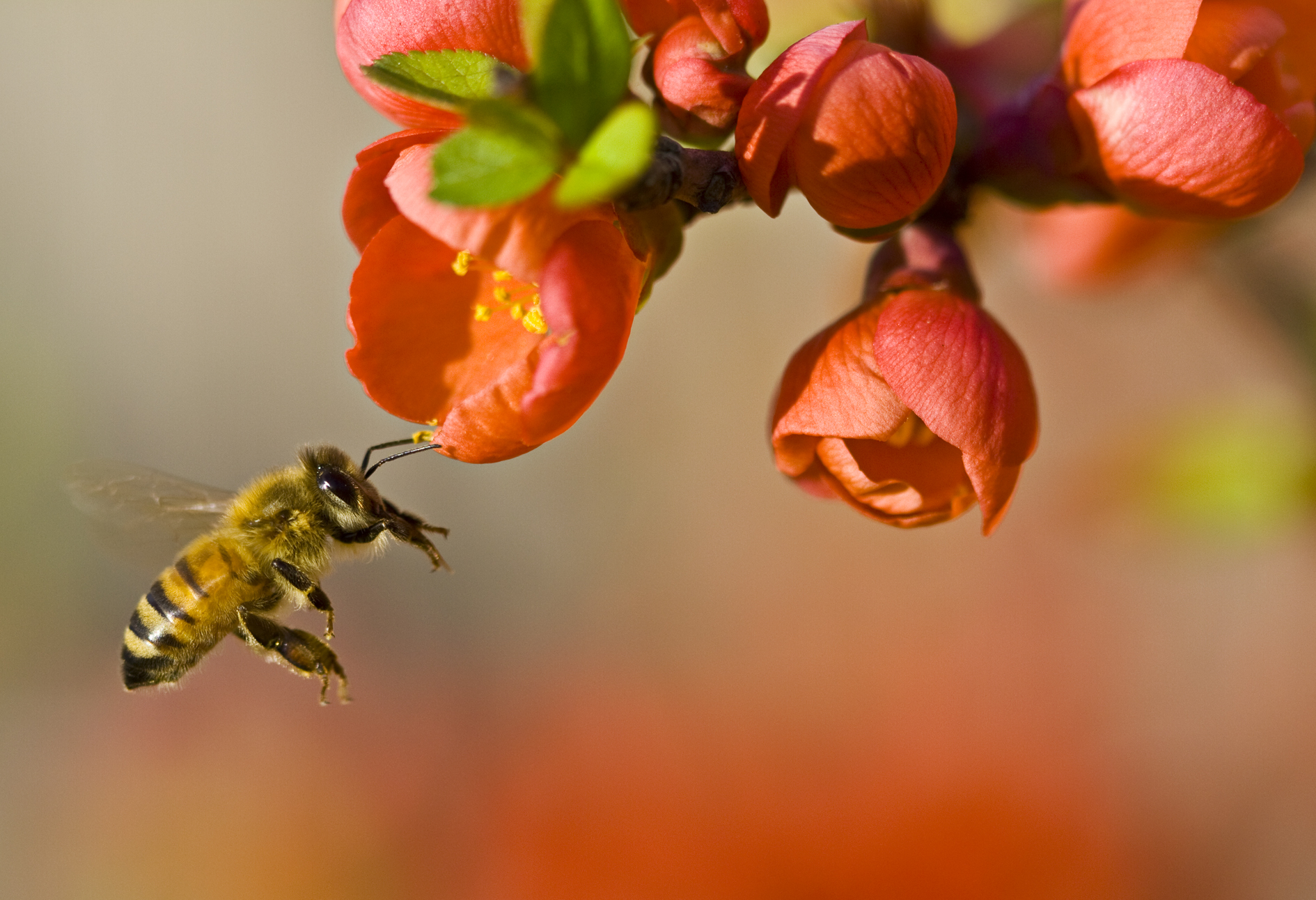
Research suggests that honey bees possess Circadian timed episodic-like memory.

Researchers in Australia found what they consider to be Circadian timed episodic-like memory in honey bees. In their study they examined foraging bees in three Y-mazes. Two mazes represented training and testing zones with different time placements. Maze C acted as the location for transfer tests. The bees were placed in Maze A in the afternoon hours of 2:30 to 5:30, whereas Maze B held bees in the morning hours of 9:30 to 12:30. All of the three mazes had two compartments, and in Mazes A and B, one held a sugar solution as a reward for making the positive decision. During training, the compartment containing the positive pattern was changed every thirty minutes. In Maze A, the positive (rewarded) pattern was a blue horizontal pattern, while the negative (non-rewarded) pattern was a blue vertical pattern. Additionally, the positive pattern for Maze B was a yellow vertical (rewarded) pattern, with a yellow horizontal pattern as a negative (non-rewarded) pattern. The three aspects of episodic-like memory in this experiment are the morning or afternoon times (when), either Maze A or B (where), and by using horizontal/vertical patterns (what).

In the first of four experiments, the colour cue was removed by using black patterns, but the shape cues remained the same. The scientists tested whether the bees would still choose the positive pattern; this decision would then be based on the what, where, and when components. Through the other three experiments, one of the cues was examined independently from the others.

They found that, on average, 96% of bees learned to forage at each maze at the appropriate time. The experimenters suggest the error rate can be accounted for by a foraging strategy, in which multiple feeding locations are visited at fixed times. Only a small number of bees visited the incorrect compartment during these times, and usually by only briefly hovered outside of it, instead of entering it. With the addition of visual pattern in this test, the bees also showed 80-88% of the time to have learned which maze to enter at the correct time. With the removal of the colour cue in both of these tests, the results remained consistent. The bees then showed they had learnt these rules by applying them to the new context, Maze C, in experiment 2. In experiment 3, based on colour cue alone, having excluded the pattern and maze location cues, the forager bees could still make a correct decision. In the final experiment, the bees used only pattern orientation cues; the lowered performance showed how much more difficult this was than when the colour cue was still present.

The researchers were uncertain, however, if the honey bees have a sense of time governed by their circadian rhythm by connecting a specific memory to a certain time period in the 24-hour cycle, or if they can measure elapsed time between two events. The difference in this type of memory from other episodic-like memory in animals is the presence of circadian timing, since normally interval timing is displayed.

Randolf Menzel also provided evidence for episodic memory in honey bees by examining their learning of spatio-temporal tasks. The bees showed learning of serial positioning, turning serial patterns into episodes. The bees showed evidence of discrimination, thus at three out of four serial positions, stimuli were independently learned. Menzel suggests strong results may be found by further isolating the configural components. Such serial pattern configuration in mammals has been interpreted as indicative of mental representations of time and space.

== Criticisms ==
Many criticisms surrounding episodic-like memory in animals revolve around the Bischof-Kohler Hypothesis. The Bischof-Kohler hypothesis holds that only humans can dissociate themselves from their current motivation and take action for future needs. It suggests that animals are incapable of anticipating future needs, and any future-oriented behaviours they exhibit are either fixed action patterns or cued by their current motivational state.

Another criticism is that it is possible that in many cases animals are simply exhibiting Garcia-type learning which involves conditioned taste aversion. This type of behavioural response occurs when a subject associates the taste of a food with negative symptoms caused by that food so that they will avoid consuming a possibly toxic substance in the future. This being said, if a scrub jay chooses one food over another preferred food that will eventually spoil this may not be planning for the future, but taste aversion to avoid getting sick from the spoiled food.

Suddendorf and Busby have also specifically criticized the term episodic-like memory and believe it should be called www-memory (what-where-when memory) instead. They argued that an animal could know what happened, where it happened, and when it happened without actually being able to remember the specific event. Likewise, personal memories are not always accurate. Therefore, remembering a personal past event does not necessarily involve remembering the when and the where of the past event.

== Areas for future research ==
It has been argued that although behavioural criteria for mental time travel have been put forward and nonverbal tests have been proposed, current research has not yet provided a sufficient demonstration of mental time travel in animals that demonstrates flexibility. Future research should focus on this component of episodic-like memory in order to demonstrate that animals are not only able to form what-where-when memories, but that they can bring together these components into an integrated framework and then modify this information later on.

For future research, it has also been suggested that as we come across similarities between animal and human abilities we should immediately question how these abilities are dissimilar so that we do not mistake similarity for equivalence. While these strong criticisms do exist, however, many of the same critics are optimistic about future research. They suggest that a demonstration of this ability may be possible as long as researchers take these criticisms and alternative explanations into account.

== See also ==
- Chronesthesia
- Episodic memory
- Hippocampus
- Memory for the future
- Western scrub jay
