= Future orientation =

In psychology and related fields, future orientation is broadly defined as the extent to which an individual thinks about the future, anticipates future consequences, and plans ahead before acting. Across development, future orientation is particularly important during periods of major changes, for example during the transition from adolescence to adulthood, when youth must make choices about social groups, academic paths, as well as risky behaviors like drug and alcohol use, and sexual activity. Several models have been developed to describe the various factors that combine to impact future orientation.

== Perspectives on future orientation ==
There are several different ways that future orientation has been observed and measured in research. The most prominent constructs include possible selves, optimism, time perspective, delay discounting. While different in definition, all of these constructs are thought to tap into and impact how people think and plan for the future. Despite the many different ways that future orientation is investigated and measured, there is evidence that a hopeful and purposeful sense of the future is associated with positive outcomes.

=== Possible selves ===
The collection of self-representations or self-knowledge that someone has about their self is referred to as their self-concept, and this is formed based on past experiences and expectations about the future. Forming a self-concept about themselves in the future is referred to as possible selves. The research on possible selves, which includes positive or negative views of the self in the future, explains that the way that youth think of themselves in the future can guide and determine current behavior. In other words, thinking of oneself in a desirable place in the future is motivating in two ways. First, it motivates individuals to work towards their desired future-self by doing things that help them reach their end goals. Secondly, individuals may also be motivated to avoid behaviors that can reduce the chances of reaching their desired self by compromising their goals. Hoped-for selves and feared selves impact future goals and aspirations. Through this, people can imagine the type of person they will become in the future.

=== Optimism ===
Optimism is thought to be a broader form of hope, that describes more generally positive expectations for the future. This is typically measured in research using surveys that include items like "I always look at the bright side of things". Optimism is typically examined with pessimism, and is thought to be a trait that is consistent over time. Optimism has a strong influence on future orientation because optimistic people generally have positive expectations for their future and believe things will happen in their favour.

=== Time perspective ===
Another way in which future orientation has been conceptualized is through time perspective. This line of research similarly focuses on how current behavior is not only determined by the present, but also the past and the future, because the past and future are present at a cognitive level. Two related components of the time perspective framework are time attitude and time orientation. Time attitude refers to a person's negative or positive attitudes toward the past, present and future. Time orientation refers to the direction (i.e., past, present, or future) that most commonly motivates a person's behavior and thinking. Using this framework, studies have shown that people who focus on the past are more likely to have adverse mental health outcomes, those who focus on the present take more risks, and those who focus on the future are more conscientious, plan, and consider future consequences.

=== Delay discounting ===
Extending from the research on executive functioning, delay discounting is defined as the extent to which a person prefers an immediate reward of less value compared to a delayed reward of more value. The task that is used to measure delay discounting is a behavioral decision-making task in which people are asked to choose between an immediate reward of less value (e.g., $400 today) and a variety of delayed rewards of more value (e.g., $700 1 month from now or $800 six months from now). How well someone performs on this task has been linked to development of brain regions, specifically the pre-frontal lobe, that are responsible for a person's reactions to rewards and punishments, and resistance to impulses. Delay discounting is used as a measure of future orientation because people need to be able to be motivated to work and plan in the present to receive the reward or reach their goal. It also provides a behavioral and neurological basis for future orientation.

== Conceptual frameworks ==
=== Thematic approach ===
This approach to understanding future orientation focuses on the content and themes individuals and groups refer to when they think about the future. This may be understood as the "cognitive representation" of the future, focusing on the specific images or domains that fill thoughts about the future. This approach of measuring future orientation gained popularity beginning in the 1980s. Traditionally, this would be measured by asking people to list their hopes and fears for the future through open-ended questions or questionnaires, which are then grouped into life domains (e.g., education, work and career, etc.). Due to the descriptive nature of this approach, the thematic approach has been particularly helpful in determining group differences in future orientation, such as gender, lower and middle class, younger and older adolescents, and ethnic groups.

==== Core and culture-specific domains ====
Through the thematic approach, core and culture-specific domains of future orientation have been identified. Despite different physical conditions, cultural orientations, and beliefs about adult roles, people growing up in different socio-cultural settings relate to a common core of four prospective life domains: education, work and career, marriage and family, and self concerns. Beyond these, people build their future according to the norms, values and life conditions in which they live (i.e., social context where they are from). For example, the individualistic orientations and economic comfort of Western societies is reflected in how Australian adolescents commonly list leisure activities, German adolescents include material comfort and Finnish adolescents list property and leisure activities. Specific country regulation, such as mandatory military service for Israeli Jewish girls and boys and Druze boys, are also reflected in the lists of adolescents from different cultures. Israeli Arab and Druze adolescents, growing up in societies that endorse family-oriented and collectivist values, also list others (i.e., family members) and the collective/community (i.e., my village, country, nation) on their list of hopes and fears for the future.

=== Component approach ===
==== Three processes model of future orientation ====
This seminal model of future orientation is a three-component model including motivation, planning and evaluation. Motivation refers to interests expressed by the goals the individuals set for themselves, planning refers to the plans and activities the individual will use to reach their goals, and evaluation refers to the individual's anticipation of successfully meeting these goals (i.e., optimism). Nurmi's model focuses primarily on the cognitive representation of anticipated events, can be applied generally to all domains (e.g., education, work and career goals).

==== Three component model of future orientation ====
This model also generally applies to different life domains and includes three components that act as steps. The three components of future orientation include: motivational, cognitive, and behavioral. Motivational component: Relates to the question of what makes people think about the future? Three variables have been suggested to impact this motivation: 1) the value of the considered life domain, the importance and relevance the individual gives to a domain (i.e., higher education, family life); 2) expectancy/confidence of hopes, goals and plans occurring and optimism towards these outcomes; 3) internal control is the extent to which the individual believes they have the power to control what happens to them. Cognitive component: How often a person thinks about their future in terms of different domains (i.e., higher education, work or career) and how the person relates to these domains in either an approach (i.e., hopes) or avoidance (i.e., fears) manner. Behavioral component: Exploration of future options by seeking advice, gathering information, and evaluating their suitability for this goal based on personality and life circumstances. Commitment refers to the extent to which the individual has made up their mind and are pursuing a specific goal.

==== Conceptual framework of Lindstrom Johnson, Blum, and Cheng (2014) ====
A third framework proposed was intended to take on an all encompassing approach to describing future orientation, specifically including developmental and environmental factors. The model includes a three-component model of future orientation that is meant to include many of the numerous conceptualizations of this construct. As such, the three components included in this model are: expectations, aspirations, and planning. Expectations includes a person's thoughts about the future (e.g., optimism), whereas aspirations captures a person's intentions and desires for the future (e.g., possible selves). Planning includes a person's awareness and ability to create a plan of action to achieve their goals (e.g., time perspective and delay discounting). Unlike the previously described models, this model also places future orientation in the context of life history and socio-cultural influences. Specifically, the model includes a horizontal axis, illustrating that future orientation develops across the lifespan (time) and is influenced by early experiences. It also includes a vertical axis which, based in developmental systems theory, demonstrates that future orientation is influenced by individual attributes (labeled as competencies) as well as environmental factors (labeled as opportunities and constraints).

== Development ==
Future orientation is innate. It is a person's thoughts, plans, motivations, hopes and feelings about his or her future. These concepts become more relevant in adolescence as future orientation increases with age, but they can be identified as early as infanthood. However, people have different experiences, cultural backgrounds and cognitive skills, all of which differ with age. Studies showed that older teenagers have greater future orientation, as shown by an increased delayed gratification, less fatalistic beliefs, and greater motivation, time perspective, and planning.

=== Infancy ===
Evidence of future orientation has been identified as early as 2 months of age. Babies anticipated events through eye movements in experiments ran in laboratory settings. In these experiments, babies were shown regular alternating and irregular sequence pictures. In the regular alternating sequence, an image appeared at one location, disappeared, and reappeared in another location. In the standard visual expectation paradigm pictures were shown repeatedly one to the right and one to the left of a visual center, separated by equal intervals. Infants' future orientation was observed in relation to the area they fixated before appearance of the picture (the side they expected the picture to appear) and the time it took them to react (reaction time). When the babies were shown regular left-right sequence, 3.5 months old babies anticipated the image more accurately and faster than did babies in the control condition, where pictures were presented at random with unequal intervals. When it comes to younger babies (2 months old), they could anticipate basic left-right designs.

=== Early childhood ===
After infancy, the expression and assessment of future orientation is mostly done verbally and is dependent on the child's understanding of the concept of time (past, present, and future). Children's knowledge and understanding of the future come from their sense of time. One of the challenges in relation to that is the ability to understand the differences between what already happened and what will happen. The ability to reconstruct the past and anticipate the future involve cognitive time travelling. Even if children can correctly use time-related terms associated to the past and the future (such as yesterday and tomorrow), they may still have difficulties distinguishing these periods. Children's ability to anticipate the future develops over time.

Future orientation is conceptually motivational, social-cultural and cognitive, but research in relation to children's understanding of the future mainly includes cognitive aspects. Researchers tend to focus on semantic aspects of the future, such as the ability to distinguish between past and future, to organize events chronologically, and their ability to think of personal events that have not happened yet. Results from these studies state that future knowledge does not emerge before the age of 3. There are differences in the approaches used to understand children's conception of the future. Friedman's model of spatial-like images suggests that knowledge of the future is based on representation of time patterns, while Weist theory of temporal systems in child language suggests that future knowledge is represented in children's language.

As children gain knowledge of the future and the way it's expressed verbally, they can engage in greater future oriented behavior like planning. The distinctiveness of planning is its future-oriented aspect. Planning demonstrates an ability to set goals and relating them to actions and activities that lead to achieving these goals.

==== Effect of parenting, siblings, and peers ====
Since time is a socially constructed concept, it can only be learned within social interactions. As such, children learn time-related concepts by listening and participating in conversations about the future. For the majority of children in this period, social interaction occurs in the home, and mainly with mothers.

As children grow from 14 to 36 months of age, their mother's conversations about time increases from 36% to 58%. Also, mothers' conversations about the future is more complex than their conversations about the past. Conversations about the future, which use more hypothetical language and conventional time markers (e.g., "tomorrow", "next week", "next year"), tend to relate to general knowledge about events, compared to specific events about the past. In addition, mothers' future talk actively involves children in their future and planning, which also gives children opportunities to learn time-related concepts and gain knowledge about the future.

=== Middle childhood ===
In middle childhood, a time where children enter schools, there's a greater focus on their ability to project themselves into the future by sharing dreams, hopes, and fears about the future. Research shows that the hopes and fears of 2nd graders go back and forth between fantasy and reality. By grade 4, future orientation is based on reality, and grade 6, a greater part of it is dedicated to their future life and their self esteem. By the time they reach middle childhood, children develop the ability to evaluate themselves in relation to both to specific aspects of their functioning like their schooling, sports performance, or relationships with family and peers and to their global worth. This is even more prevalent as they approach adolescence.

=== Adolescence ===
In adolescence, there is an increase in risky behaviours, such as unsafe sex, delinquency, and impulsivity. Future orientation and healthy self-esteem may both serve as protective factors against engaging in risky behavior. As asserted in problem behaviour theory, teenagers who have positive expectations for success of an optimistic view of their future are less likely to take part in problem behaviours. Adolescents who have greater future orientation are less likely to be delinquent, use drugs, or have school-related problems.

During adolescence, the sense of hopefulness for the future can facilitate positive development and successful transition into adulthood. High levels of hope have been associated with academic achievement, social acceptance, feelings of self-worth, and global psychological well-being. Adolescents who think critically about their future selves as well as have a positive sense of self are more likely to discover various aspects of their identity and turn out better than those who do not.

Future orientation is also related to socioeconomic status. Teens that come from a poorer background and whose families receive public assistance tend to have greater fatalistic attitudes about the future. Higher levels of parents' academic achievement are also related to increased educational and career orientation. In addition, higher levels of future orientation are associated with less violent behaviors in teenage years.

==== Effect of parenting ====
Parenting is associated with adolescents' future orientation. The way parental acceptance and autonomy granting is perceived by adolescents is associated with their motivation to participate in future thoughts and behaviors. Security related to maternal attachment, parental involvement, parental socialization, and parental support are also related to adolescents' self-efficacy and motivation to engage in future thought. Adolescents who view their parents as supportive and encouraging express more optimism toward the future and build more extended and distinguished future orientation. In a retrospective study, emerging adults' optimism about the future was related to the memory of time spent together with parents and their upbringing.

==== Effect of siblings ====
Relationships with siblings is associated to future orientation through self-agency that represents the interpersonal aspect of the self, as indicated by self-reliance, independence, and personal strength. This may be guided by adolescents' need for individuation.

==== Effect of peers ====
Peers also play a role in future orientation in adolescence. They can serve as a source of warmth and support and as ways to socialize. Peers may provide essential information, encourage the development of cognitive skills and ideas, help kids and teens to assess their attitudes and beliefs, and improve their social understanding and social skills. Positive parenting encourages positive peer relationships among children and adolescents, and negative parenting (indicated by parental neglect, anger, strict discipline, or excluding children from relevant decisions) leads to associating with peers partaking in antisocial behavior and noncompliant behavior, aggression toward peers, and school misconduct (externalizing behavior). Social cues and influences from peers can influence what adolescents might achieve or how they might behave, in that those whose social influence is negative tend to have negative future selves and may engage in more risky behaviors.

=== Adulthood ===
Research on future orientation in adulthood is scarce, as the literature focuses on adolescence and emerging adulthood. However, younger adults (21–39 years old) generally tend to be more future oriented than older adults (60–86 years old), who tend to focus more on the past.

== Self and future orientation ==
Individuals who have a clear sense of self are less likely to have depression, anxiety and externalizing behavior problems. These individuals also tend to have positive thoughts about their future and be more confident.

There are many associations between self-esteem and motivation. As an indicator of emotional health, self-esteem allows people to pay attention to current and future-oriented tasks. Also, the value-expectancy proposition suggests that one's positive self-evaluation has a direct effect on the value of a task and one's expectation in relation to task-specific success. People who value themselves also value the tasks they perform, and their sense of self-worth gives rise to expectations of success and attributions associated to an internal locus of control.

== Sex differences ==
Evolutionary psychology and gender role theory predict that in developing their future orientation adolescent girls will devote more time to relational areas like marriage and family, and adolescent boys will invest more in instrumental domains such as work and career. This view differs depending on the time period and context. In the late 1950s in the United States, studies confirmed the gender differences hypothesis, since girls often viewed future life as depending on the man they would marry. Girls' future orientation included fewer stories about the work and career domain and more stories about marriage and family. However, since the 1980s in the United States, Europe (Belgium, Finland, Germany, the Netherlands, and Poland), Australia, Singapore and Israel, studies only partly replicated those earlier findings. Some European studies showed that girls are more concerned with marriage and family and less with work and career issues than boys, other studies reported no differences. In general, girls have a stronger future orientation than boys. They tend to be more realistic, and have greater motivation and planning skills. The overall effect of parents on adolescents' future outcomes is also greater for girls than for boys.

== Environmental factors ==
Environmental factors like violence and poverty hinder a person's ability to think about the future and limit their hope for the future. Poverty may negatively influence the ability to think about the future, which can give rise to feelings of hopelessness. In the same way, life in a violent neighborhood may not lead one to be trustful and hopeful. Teens who grow up in violent environments may not be able to see a future for themselves and believe their only option is a life of delinquency. If youth don't have positive expectations for the future and don't see their behaviors as being related to future goals, they may not be worried about consequence of risk taking behaviors like criminal involvement and violent behaviors. Equally, if individuals want a positive future for themselves they would engage in less compromising behaviors to guarantee that they reach their future goals.

== Impact ==
=== Academic achievement ===
Researchers looking at the connection between future orientation and academic achievement have found that students who envision a positive self in the future are motivated to succeed academically and plan for the future. For example, a study that looked at the connection between possible self in the future and academic achievement found that among sixth, seventh and eighth graders those who are more optimistic towards their possible self had higher grades than students who had a more limited view of their self in the future. Another study looked at future orientation and academic achievement in low-income rural and urban African American adolescents in grades 7 to 12. They found that higher future orientation and ethnic identity were positively related to academic achievement (i.e., higher GPAs).

=== Problem behaviours ===
Future orientation may not only motivate future-oriented behaviors, such as pursuing academic achievements and future goals, but also influence the decision-making process about whether to engage in problem behaviors. If youth do not have positive expectations for the future and do not see current behaviors as linked to future goals they may not be concerned with the consequences of risk taking behaviors such as consuming substances, criminal involvement and violent behaviors. For example, a study found youth (who had previously been in trouble with that law) who had a positive future orientation were less likely to use marijuana, had less alcohol related problems (i.e., frequency and quantity of use), and believed there to be greater risks involved with alcohol and drug use. Another study looked at the impact of positive future orientation over a span of 10 years in African American youth. This study found that higher levels of future orientation (i.e., thinking more often about the future) was associated with greater decreases in violent behavior (e.g., carried a knife, gotten in a fight at school or outside of school) over time. Overall, research suggests that thinking about, planning for and valuing future goals can decrease the chances that youth will participate in risky and dangerous behaviours.

== See also ==
- Foresight (psychology)
- Future-oriented therapy
- Futures techniques
- Goal orientation
- Goal setting
- Prospection
- Strategic planning
- Strategic thinking
- Time perception
- Vision statement
