= Frederick T. Melges =

American psychiatrist (1935–1988)

- Born: 2 December 1935
- Died: 29 July 1988 (aged 52)

Philosophical work
- Main interests: Psychiatry
- Notable ideas: Sense of time

Frederick T. Melges (2 December 1935 – 29 July 1988) was an American psychiatrist and professor of psychiatry at Stanford University School of Medicine, notable for his interest in time and for his pioneering work on the role of distortions of time in various psychiatric disorders.

== Career ==
Melges led research work at Stanford University in the 1970s on cannabis users. Melges and colleagues were the first to report that cannabis induced "temporal disintegration" or a disorganization of sequential thought and impaired goal-directedness. This phenomenon stems partly from impaired immediate memory. Melges and colleagues also showed that depersonalization is closely associated with the degree of temporal disintegration. This work led Melges to conclude that the disorientation in the sense of time might represent a key action of the drug from which many other effects followed.

Melges went on to propose a future oriented therapy. Melges (1982, p. 35) argued that: "Many forms of mental illness are characterized by a bleak, foreshortened or fragmented future time perspective." He proposed that time distortions are prevalent in psychiatric illnesses and that they can cloud the personal future of an individual distorting their view of their future and thereby disrupting goal-directed behavior. Melges's emphasis on the importance of the future in understanding mental illness provided a framework for focusing psychiatric treatment on time and the future. The most significant work to document his findings on the essential value of time and his ideas on future oriented therapy are found in his only book, Time and the Inner Future (1982).

Melges suffered from Type I diabetes and at times wondered whether he would live to see his life's work completed. In his book's epilogue, Melges explains:

While I was writing this book, my own future was under almost constant threat. The specter of death made time ever so precious.

Since I had been conducting studies on time and the mind for 18 years, and since I had come to realize the importance of time and the personal future in clinical work with my patients, I had a great desire to complete this book before I died.

The year that I started the first draft was the very year that the long-term complications of my juvenile diabetes began to take their greatest toll. (p. 289)

During his battle with diabetes, Melges's kidneys failed, and required a transplant, which at the age of 43 was donated to him by his mother. Melges died years later, in 1988.

== See also ==
- Cybernetics
- Time perception

== Selected bibliography ==
- Melges, F. T.; Bowlby, J. (1969). "Types of hopelessness in psychopathological processes". Archives of General Psychiatry. 20 (6): 690–699. doi:10.1001/archpsyc.1969.01740180074007. PMID 4890814.
- Melges, F. T.; Tinklenberg, J. R.; Hollister, L. E. & Gillespie, H. K. (1970). "Temporal disintegration and depersonalization during marijuana intoxication". Archives of General Psychiatry. 23 (3): 204–210. doi:10.1001/archpsyc.1970.01750030012003. PMID 4916452.
- Melges, F. T.; Tinklenberg, J. R.; Hollister, L. E. & Gillespie, H. K. (1970). "Marihuana and temporal disintegration". Science. 168 (3935): 1118–1120. Bibcode:1970Sci...168.1118M. doi:10.1126/science.168.3935.1118. PMID 4909766. S2CID 42305875.
- Melges, F. T. (1972). "Future-oriented psychotherapy". American Journal of Psychotherapy. 26 (1): 22–33. doi:10.1176/appi.psychotherapy.1972.26.1.22. PMID 5060589.
- Melges, F. T. (1982). Time and the Inner Future: A Temporal Approach to Psychiatric Disorders. New York: John Wiley and Sons. ISBN 0-471-86075-1.
