= Future-oriented therapy =

Approach to psychotherapy

Future-oriented therapy (FOT) and future-directed therapy (FDT) are approaches to psychotherapy that place greater emphasis on the future than on the past or present.

== History ==
The term future-oriented therapy was first used in an article by psychologist Walter O'Connell in 1964, after which the term was used as the title of an article by psychiatrist Stanley Lesse in 1971. Psychiatrist Frederick T. Melges also used the term in his writings in the 1970s and 1980s. In the 2000s, psychiatrist Bernard Beitman, inspired in part by Melges, wrote about future-oriented formulation and about how emphasis on the future is a common factor among different approaches to psychotherapy and is a basis for integrating psychotherapies. Future-directed therapy, an intervention with a similar emphasis on the future (developed independently of the previous future-oriented therapies), was first tested by psychologist Jennice Vilhauer and colleagues in 2011, and in 2014 was the subject of a self-help book that aimed to help readers "overcome negative emotions, identify what you want in life, transform limiting beliefs, take action, live ready for success".

== Lesse's approach ==
Stanley Lesse's approach, published in 1971, stressed the need for all future psychiatrists, psychologists, social scientists, and political scientists to understand the relationships between sociodynamics and individual psychodynamics. Lesse viewed discussion of the future as a prophylactic (preventative) technique and guided patients over a relatively brief number of sessions to consider their role in the future in order to prepare for the impending stresses and challenges.

== Melges's approach ==
In 1972, Frederick T. Melges published a paper about a future-oriented intervention, which he referred to as FOT. A decade later he wrote a book chapter describing the intervention. Melges's FOT is based on a psychodynamic model and was intended to be an adjunctive intervention, not a treatment for psychiatric disorders. Melges described it a "useful adjunct to past- and present-oriented therapies" to help patients with issues such as low self-esteem and identity diffusion. According to Melges:

The general thesis is that time distortions disrupt anticipatory control and lead to psychopathological spirals. That is, problems with time, such as distortions of sequence, rate, and temporal perspective, disrupt the normal interplay between future images, plans of action, and emotions, thereby leading to lack of anticipatory control and vicious cycles (spirals).

Melges proposed that the harmonization of future images, plans of action, and emotions restore a person's sense of hope and control over the future: "Thus, with hope, the personal future is not certain and fixed, but is viewed as being open, unfrozen, and full of opportunities." There were five stages to Melges's FOT treatment:

1. Assessment and selection of patients
2. Interpretation of vicious cycles
3. Redecisions
4. Self-futuring
5. Temporal organization

In a 1983 review of Melges's book, psychiatrist Lenore Terr said that "the author must be commended for his very ambitious attempt to characterize broadly what happens to time sense in the major mental disorders", but she also noted: "Some of the author's theoretical proposals are clear and seem to be right, but unfortunately some go too far."

Philip Zimbardo and John Boyd have described how "psychologist Susan Nolen-Hoeksema extended Melges's work on time and depression in studying the ways in which preoccupation with the past reinforces depression." Zimbardo and Boyd explained that an obsession with the past makes people less able to think about the future, according to Nolen-Hoeksema and her colleagues. "The key to relieving depression lies not in untangling the Gordian knot of the past but in accepting and planning for the uncertain future."

== Other approaches ==
A wide range of approaches, such as future-oriented group training, future-oriented writing therapy, future-directed therapy, and others, have been developed to help people to confront the future and the uncertainties, complexities, and discontinuities implied by the future.

Zimbardo and Boyd's time perspective theory, which differentiates between several future time perspectives (general or basic, future transcendental, future negative, and future positive), has been applied in time perspective coaching and time perspective therapy.

== See also ==
- Creative visualization
- Creativity techniques
- Decisional balance sheet
- Foresight (psychology)
- Future map
- Future orientation
- Futures techniques
- Goal orientation
- Goal setting
- Prospection
- Self-efficacy
- Solution-focused brief therapy
- Strategic planning
- Strategic thinking
- Time perception
- Vision statement
