= Hoarding (animal behavior) =

Behavior; storage of food in hidden locations

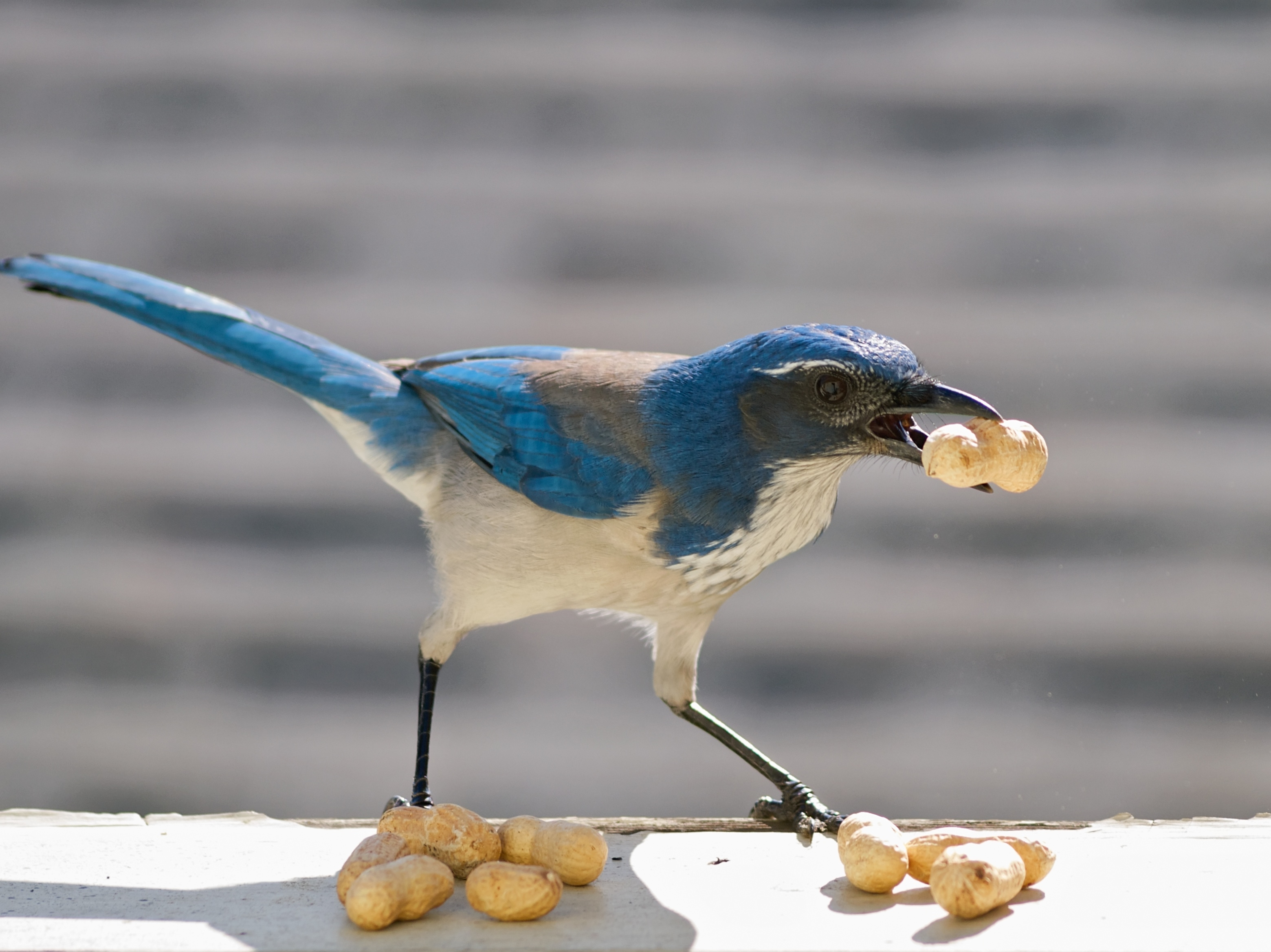
Western scrub jays cache food such as acorns and insects.

Hoarding or caching in animal behavior is the storage of food in locations hidden from the sight of both conspecifics (animals of the same or closely related species) and members of other species. Most commonly, the function of hoarding or caching is to store food in times of surplus for times when food is less plentiful. However, there is evidence that some caching or hoarding is undertaken with the aim of ripening the food so stored, and this practice is thus referred to as ‘ripening caching’. The term hoarding is most typically used for rodents, whereas caching is more commonly used in reference to birds, but the behaviors in both animal groups are quite similar.

Hoarding is done either on a long-term basis—cached on a seasonal cycle, with food to be consumed months later—or on a short-term basis, in which case the food will be consumed over a period of one or several days.

Some common animals that cache their food are rodents such as hamsters and squirrels, and many different bird species, such as rooks and woodpeckers. The western scrub jay is noted for its particular skill at caching. There are two types of caching behavior: larder hoarding, where a species creates a few large caches which it often defends, and scatter hoarding, where a species will create multiple caches, often with each individual food item stored in a unique place. Both types of caching have their advantages.

== Function ==
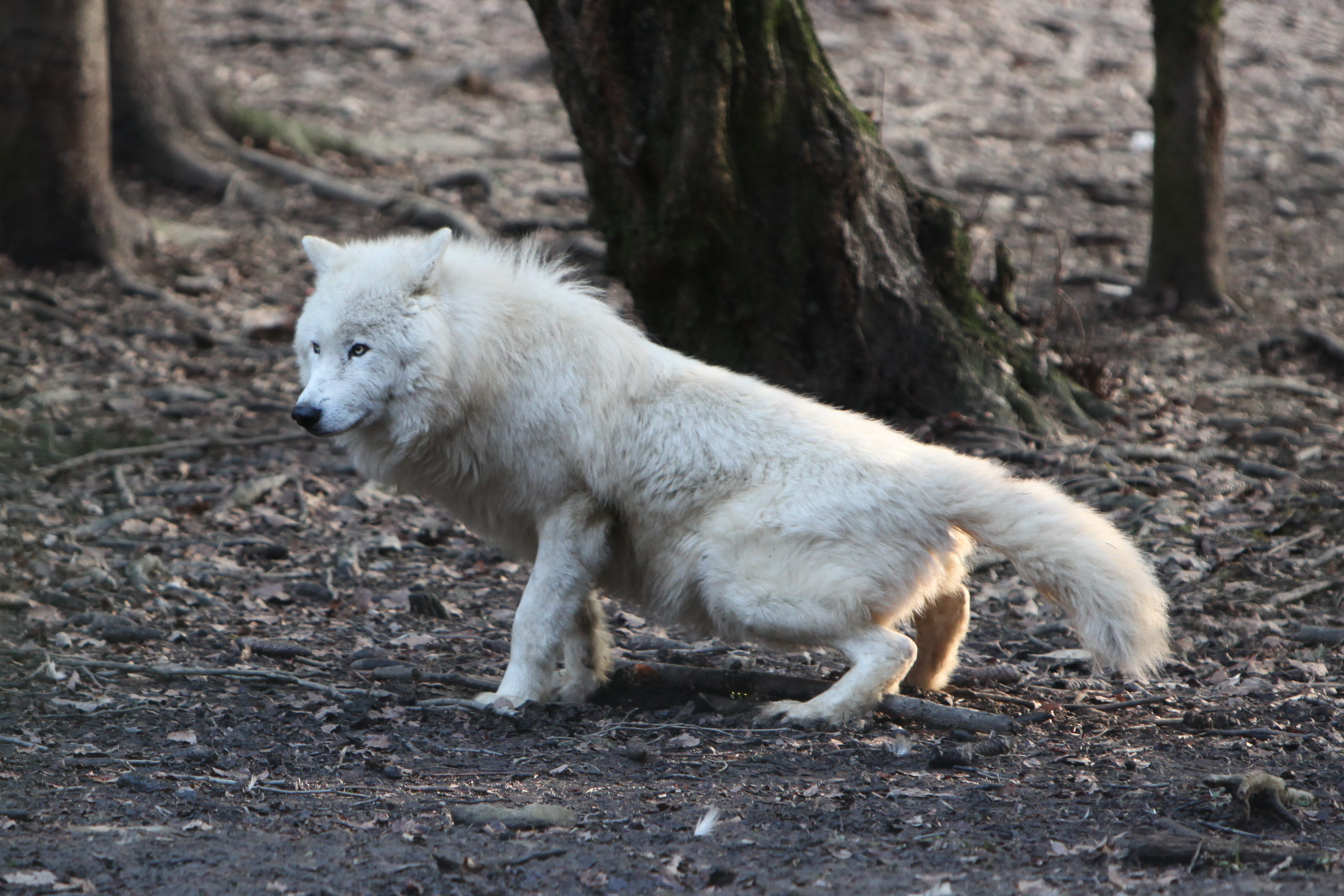
Wolves urinate on food caches after emptying them.

Caching behavior is typically a way to save excess edible food for later consumption—either soon to be eaten food, such as when a jaguar hangs partially eaten prey from a tree to be eaten within a few days, or long term, where the food is hidden and retrieved many months later. Caching is a common adaptation to seasonal changes in food availability. In regions where winters are harsh, food availability typically becomes low, and caching food during the times of high food availability in the warmer months provides a significant survival advantage. For species that hoard perishable food, weather can significantly affect the accumulation, use and rotting of the stored food. This phenomenon is referenced in the fable The Ant and the Grasshopper.

However, in ripening caching behavior, animals collect and cache food which is immediately inedible but will become "ripe" and edible after a short while. For instance, tayras (a Central American weasel) have been observed to harvest whole green plantains, hide them, and then come back to eat them after they have ripened. Leafcutter ants harvest pieces of inedible leaves and then cache them in underground chambers to ripen with a fungus which is the main food for the colony. Contrary to popular belief, there is no scientific evidence that crocodilians such as the American Alligator cache large prey underwater to consume later.

== Hoard distribution and size ==
Scatter hoarding is the formation of a large number of small hoards. This behavior is present in both birds (especially the Canada jay) and small mammals, mainly squirrels and other rodents, such as the eastern gray squirrel, fox squirrel, and wood mouse. Species that do not migrate to warmer climates or hibernate for winter are the most likely to scatter hoard. This behavior plays an important part in seed dispersal, as those seeds that are left uneaten will have a chance to germinate, thus enabling plants to spread their populations effectively. Scatter hoarders store food outside their bodies because they must remain active during the caching period in order to hide as much food in as many places as possible; storing the food inside their bodies would reduce their mobility and be counterproductive to this objective.

Cache spacing is the primary technique that scatter hoarders use to protect food from pilferers. By spreading the food supply around geographically, hoarders discourage competitors who happen upon a cache from conducting area-restricted searching for more of the supply. Despite cache spacing, hoarders are still unable to eliminate the threat of pilferage. However, having multiple cache sites is costly because it requires good spatial memory. Scatter-hoarders generally have larger hippocampi than animals that do not participate in scatter-hoarding behavior. Additionally, studies have shown that hippocampal volume in scatter-hoarders varies seasonally and based on the harshness of the climate that the animal lives in.

In larder hoarding, the hoard is large and is found in a single place termed a larder, which usually also serves as the nest where the animal lives. Hamsters are well-known larder hoarders; the German verb "hamstern" (to hoard) is derived from the noun "Hamster" which refers to the rodent, and similar verbs are found in various related languages (Dutch hamsteren, and Swedish hamstra). Other languages also draw a clear connection between hamsters and hoarding: e.g. Polish chomikować, from chomik. A disadvantage of larder hoarding is that if a cache is raided, this is far more problematic for the animal than if it were a scatter hoarder. While the hoard is much easier to remember the location of, these larger hoards must also be more staunchly defended.

== Related behaviors ==
=== Guarding ===
Most species are particularly wary of onlooking individuals during caching and ensure that the cache locations are secret. Not all caches are concealed however, for example shrikes store prey items on thorns on branches in the open.

=== Shared or individual hoarding ===
Although a few species share food stores, food hoarding is a solo endeavor for most species, including almost all rodents and birds. For example, a number of jays live in large family groups, but they do not demonstrate sharing of cached food. Rather, they hoard their food supply individually, caching and retrieving the supply in secret.

There are only two species in which kin selection has resulted in a shared food store, i.e. beavers (Castor canadensis) and acorn woodpeckers (Melanerpes formicivorous); the former live in family groups and construct winter larders of submerged branches, while the latter are unusual in that they construct a conspicuous communal larder.

Wolves, foxes, and coyotes identify their food caches by scent-marking them, usually after they have been emptied.

=== Pilfering ===
Pilferage occurs when one animal takes food from another animal's larder. Some species experience high levels of cache pilferage, up to 30% of the supply per day. Models of scatter hoarding suggested the value of cached food is equal to the hoarder's ability to retrieve it.

=== Reciprocal pilfering ===
It has been observed that members of certain species, such as rodents and chickadees, act as both hoarder and pilferer. In other words, pilfering can be reciprocal and, thus, tolerable.

=== Recaching ===
Animals recache the food that they have pilfered from other animals' caches. For example, 75% of mildly radioactive (thus traceable) Jeffrey pine seeds cached by yellow pine chipmunks were found in two cache sites, 29% of the seeds were found in three sites, 9.4% were found in four sites and 1.3% were found in five sites over a 3-month period. These results, and those from other studies, demonstrate the dynamic nature of the food supplies of scatter hoarding animals.

=== Deception ===
Group-foraging common ravens, (Corvus corax), scatter hoard their food and also raid the caches made by others. Cachers withdraw from conspecifics when hiding their food and most often place their caches behind structures, obstructing the view of potential observers. Raiders watch inconspicuously and keep at a distance to cachers close to their cache sites. In response to the presence of potential raiders or because of their initial movements towards caches, the cachers frequently interrupt caching, change cache sites, or recover their food items. These behaviors suggest that ravens are capable of withholding information about their intentions, which may qualify as tactical deception.

Similarly, Eurasian jays (Garrulus glandarius) when being watched by another jay, prefer to cache food behind an opaque barrier rather than a transparent barrier, suggesting they may opt to cache in out-of-view locations to reduce the likelihood of other jays pilfering their caches.

== See also ==
- Food storage
