= Retrocognition =

Concept in parapsychology

Retrocognition (also known as postcognition or hindsight), from the Latin retro meaning "backward, behind" and cognition meaning "knowing," describes "knowledge of a past event which could not have been learned or inferred by normal means." The term was coined by Frederic W. H. Myers.

== Overview ==
Scientific researchers into psychic phenomena have long considered retrocognition untestable. To verify an accurate retrocognitive experience, existing documents and human knowledge must be consulted, which raises the possibility that the information was already known contemporaneously.

For instance, if a psychic purports to have retrocognitive knowledge that "Winston Churchill was once bitten by a parrot", the only way of verifying that knowledge would be to consult extant sources of Churchill's activities. If it is found that he was, indeed, once bitten by a parrot, it could be said that the psychic "simply" obtained contemporary knowledge of this fact (by clairvoyance or telepathy, if need be, of the relevant documents, or someone's knowledge of them), rather than directly perceived – in the manner of retrocognition – any event in Churchill's past. Given this fundamental logical difficulty, there has been very little experimental investigation by parapsychologists of retrocognition. The evidence for retrocognition has, therefore, been limited to naturalistic cases suggestive of the phenomenon.

The most popularly celebrated case of retrocognition concerns the visions in 1901 of Annie Moberly and Eleanor Jourdain – two scholars and early administrators of British university education for women – as they tried to find their way to Marie Antoinette's private château, the Petit Trianon. Becoming lost on their way, they believed that they instead came unto the Queen's presence itself. They published an account of their experience in 1911 as An Adventure. Moberly and Jourdain described how they had become convinced, over the following weeks, that persons they saw and even spoke to on that occasion – given certain details of dress, accent, topography and architecture – must have been of a presumed recollection by Marie Antoinette, on 10 August 1792, of her last days at Trianon in 1789. While often considered in popular literature as evidence for retrocognition, the book was immediately dismissed by Eleanor Sidgwick, a leading member of the British Society for Psychical Research, in an article published in its Proceedings, as the product of mutual confabulation.

== See also ==
- Foresight (psychology)
- List of topics characterized as pseudoscience
- Precognition
- Remote viewing
- Time slip
- Time travel claims and urban legends
