= Foresight (psychology) =

Behavior-based backcasting & forecasting factors

Foresight is the ability to predict, or the action of predicting, what will happen or what is needed in the future. Studies suggest that much of human thought is directed towards potential future events. Because of this, the nature and evolution of foresight is an important topic in psychology. Thinking about the future is studied under the label prospection.

Neuroscientific, developmental, and cognitive studies have identified many similarities to the human ability to recall past episodes. Science magazine selected evidence for such similarities as one of the top ten scientific breakthroughs of 2007. However, fundamental differences separate mentally travelling through time into the future (i.e., foresight) versus mentally travelling through time into the past (i.e., episodic memory).

== Uses ==
Foresight has been classified as a behaviour (covert and/or overt) in management. Review, analysis, and synthesis of past definitions and usages of the foresight concept attempted to establish a generic definition, in order to make the concept measurable.

Specifically, foresight has been defined as: "Degree of analyzing present contingencies and degree of moving the analysis of present contingencies across time, and degree of analyzing a desired future state or states a degree ahead in time with regard to contingencies under control, as well as degree of analyzing courses of action a degree ahead in time to arrive at the desired future state."

== Prediction markets ==
Prediction markets are exchange-traded markets created for the purpose of trading on the possible outcomes of events. This information-revealing mechanism is credited to economists Ludwig von Mises and Friedrich Hayek. Prediction markets allow people to aggregate information and make predictions.

== See also ==
- Future-oriented therapy – form of psychotherapy
- Future orientation – the extent to which an individual thinks about the future, anticipates future consequences, and plans ahead before acting
- Future self – Research that examines the processes of thinking of oneself in the future
- Futures techniques – Futures studies lessons learned methods
- Goal orientation – Social-cognitive motivational disposition
- Goal setting – Development of an action plan in order to achieve a goal
- Prospection – Generation and evaluation of mental representations of possible futures
- Retrocognition – Concept in parapsychology
- Vision (spirituality) – Something seen in a dream, trance, or religious ecstasy
