= Prospection =

Generation and evaluation of mental representations of possible futures

In psychology, prospection is the generation and evaluation of mental representations of possible futures. The term therefore captures a wide array of future-oriented psychological phenomena, including the prediction of future emotion (affective forecasting), the imagination of future scenarios (episodic foresight), and planning. Prospection is central to various aspects of human cognition and motivation. Daniel Gilbert (psychologist) and Timothy Wilson coined the term in 2007. It has since become a central area of enquiry in the cognitive sciences.

== Prospection and learning ==
Even fundamental learning processes are, in some sense, forms of prospection. Associative learning enables individual animals to track local regularities in their environments and adapt their behaviour accordingly, in order to maximise their chances of positive outcomes and minimise risks. Animals that are capable of positive and negative states (for example pleasure and pain) can eventually learn about the consequences of their actions and thereby predict imminent rewards and punishments before they occur. This enables animals to change their current actions accordingly in line with prospective consequences.

== Relationship with mental time travel ==
Mental time travel refers to the ability to mentally reconstruct personal events from the past (known as episodic memory), as well as to imagine personal future events (known as episodic foresight). Mental time travel into the future (episodic foresight or episodic future thinking) is therefore one of several types of 'prospection' that refers to the capacity to simulate or imagine personal future events.

== Examples of the functions of prospection ==
=== Episodic foresight ===
Episodic foresight is the capacity to imagine personal future scenarios and shape current action accordingly.

=== Predicting future emotions (affective forecasting) ===
The feelings evoked during episodic foresight enable people to infer how they would really feel if the event were to happen in reality. This thereby enables people to anticipate whether future events are desirable or undesirable, and ability called 'affective forecasting'.

=== Prospective intentions ===
Simulating the future enables people to create intentions for future actions. Prospective memory is the form of memory that involves remembering to perform these planned intentions, or to recall them at some future point in time. Prospective memory tasks are common in everyday life, ranging from remembering to post a letter to remembering to take one's medication.

=== Deliberate practice ===
People anticipate that it is possible to shape their future self. To acquire new knowledge or additional skills, people therefore engage in repeated actions driven by the goal to improve these future capacities. This deliberate practice is essential not only for elite performance but also in the acquirement of numerous everyday feats.

=== Flexible decision-making ===
Intertemporal choices are choices with outcomes that play out over time. Such decisions are ubiquitous in everyday life, ranging from routine decisions about what to eat for lunch (i.e. whether to adhere to a diet) to more profound decisions about climate change (i.e. whether to reduce current energy expenditure to avoid delayed costs). The ability to imagine future scenarios and adjust decisions accordingly may be important for making intertemporal choices in a flexible manner that accords with delayed consequences. Accumulating evidence suggests that cuing people to imagine the future in vivid detail can encourage preferences for delayed outcomes over immediate ones. This has been extended into real-world decisions such as in reducing the consumption of high-calorie food and increasing pro-environmental behaviours.

== Clinical impairment ==
In recent years there have been a range of investigations into variation in prospection and its functions in clinical populations. Deficits to the mechanisms and functions of prospection have been observed in Alzheimer's disease and other age-related dementias, Schizophrenia, and after brain damage (especially to the medial temporal lobes).

Shifts in the content and modes of prospection have been observed in affective disorders. For example, in both clinical depression and anxiety there is an overrepresentation of possible negative future events. In depression, there is additionally a reduction in the generation of possible positive future events. There are also a range of changes to the representational format (i.e. whether people tend to represent the future in episodic or semantic detail) in affective disorders.

== See also ==
- Constructivism (psychological school)
- Foresight (psychology)
- Future orientation
- Future-oriented therapy
- Futures techniques
- Goal orientation
- Goal setting
- Mental time travel
