= Western scrub jay =

Western scrub jay has been split into the following species:

- California scrub jay, Aphelocoma californica
- Woodhouse's scrub jay, Aphelocoma woodhouseii

The island scrub jay, A. insularis, is a scrub jay and lives in the West, but was not part of the western scrub jay species.
