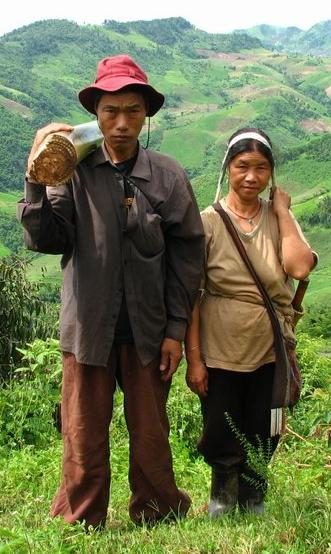
- Male (left) and female (right) adult humans of the Akha people in northern Thailand. The male is carrying the stem of a banana plant, which will be fed to their pigs.

Scientific classification
- Kingdom: Animalia
- Phylum: Chordata
- Class: Mammalia
- Order: Primates
- Superfamily: Hominoidea
- Family: Hominidae
- Genus: Homo
- Species: H. sapiens

Binomial name
- Homo sapiens Linnaeus, 1758
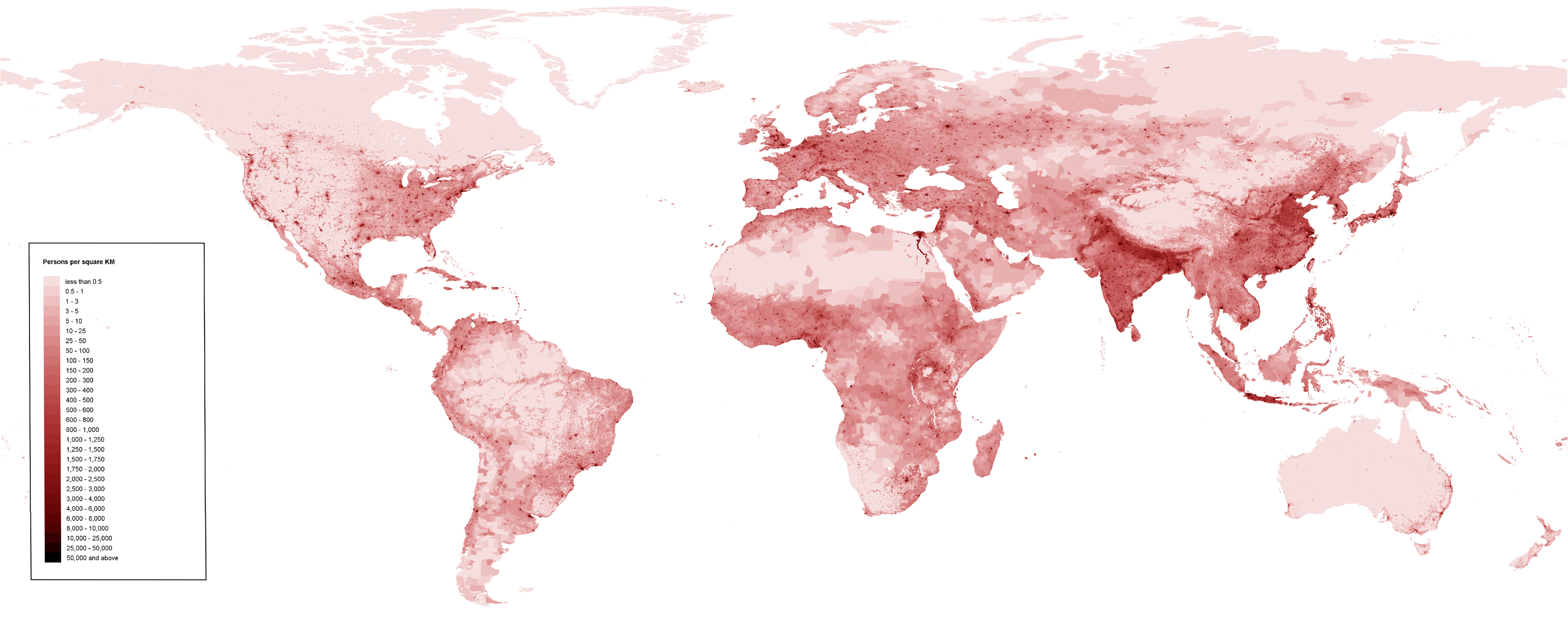
- Homo sapiens population density (2020)

Audio
- Audio of a newborn baby crying, the most universally produced human vocal signal

= Human =

Human Temporal range: 0.3–0 Ma Chibanian – present

Species of hominid in the genus Homo

Humans (Homo sapiens, meaning 'thinking man' or 'wise man', and collectively referred to as 'mankind' or 'humanity') are the most abundant and widespread species of primates, characterized by bipedalism, minimal body hair, and large, complex brains enabling the development of advanced technology, culture, and language. Humans are highly social beings and tend to live in complex social structures composed of many cooperating and competing groups, from families and kinship networks to political states. Social interactions between humans have established a wide variety of values, social norms, and rituals, which bolster human society. Curiosity and the human desire to understand and influence the environment have motivated humanity's development of art, science, philosophy, religion, mythology, and other fields of knowledge.

Humans have a large and highly developed prefrontal cortex, the region of the brain associated with higher cognition. They are intelligent beings, capable of episodic memory, flexible facial expressions, self-awareness and a theory of mind. The human mind is capable of introspection (metacognition), private thought, imagination, volition, and forming views on existence. Humans can also mentally travel through time (chronesthesia), which signifies episodic foresight. These attributes have allowed them to achieve large technological advancements through reason and the transmission of knowledge to future generations. In anthropology, the cumulative preservation and advancement of knowledge across generations is known as the ratchet effect.

Humans are omnivorous, capable of consuming a wide variety of plant and animal material, and have used fire to prepare and cook food. They can survive for up to eight weeks without food, and three or four days without water. Humans are generally diurnal, sleeping on average seven to nine hours per day. Human childbirth is dangerous, with a high risk of complications and death. Both the mother and the father typically provide care for human offspring, who are helpless at birth.

Genes and the environment influence human biological variation in appearance, physiology, immune system, mental abilities, body size, and lifespan. Though humans vary in many traits, any two humans are on average over 99% genetically similar, with the most genetically diverse populations being from Africa. The greatest degree of genetic variation exists between males and females. The genetic difference between males and females is around 1% to 2%. On average, males have greater body strength and females generally have a higher body fat percentage. Females undergo menopause and become infertile potentially decades before the end of their lives. They also have a longer life span in almost every population around the world. The division into male and female gender roles has varied historically, and challenges to predominant gender norms have recurred in many societies.

The evolutionary branch humans descended from split from other hominins in Africa several million years ago. Although some scientists equate humans with all members of the genus Homo, in common usage it generally refers to Homo sapiens, the only extant member. Homo sapiens emerged around 300,000 years ago and migrated out of Africa, gradually replacing local populations of archaic humans. Early humans were hunter-gatherers, before the invention of agriculture and domestication of animals led to permanent settlement in the Fertile Crescent and other cradles of civilization. As food surpluses enabled populations to become larger and denser, forms of governance developed, the use of writing became necessary, and a number of civilizations rose and fell. Humans have continued to expand, with over 8.3 billion humans occupying almost all regions of Earth in 2026, and have even visited the Moon. This expansion, combined with industrialization, has led to environmental destruction and pollution that significantly contributes to the ongoing mass extinction of many other forms of life.

== Etymology and definition ==
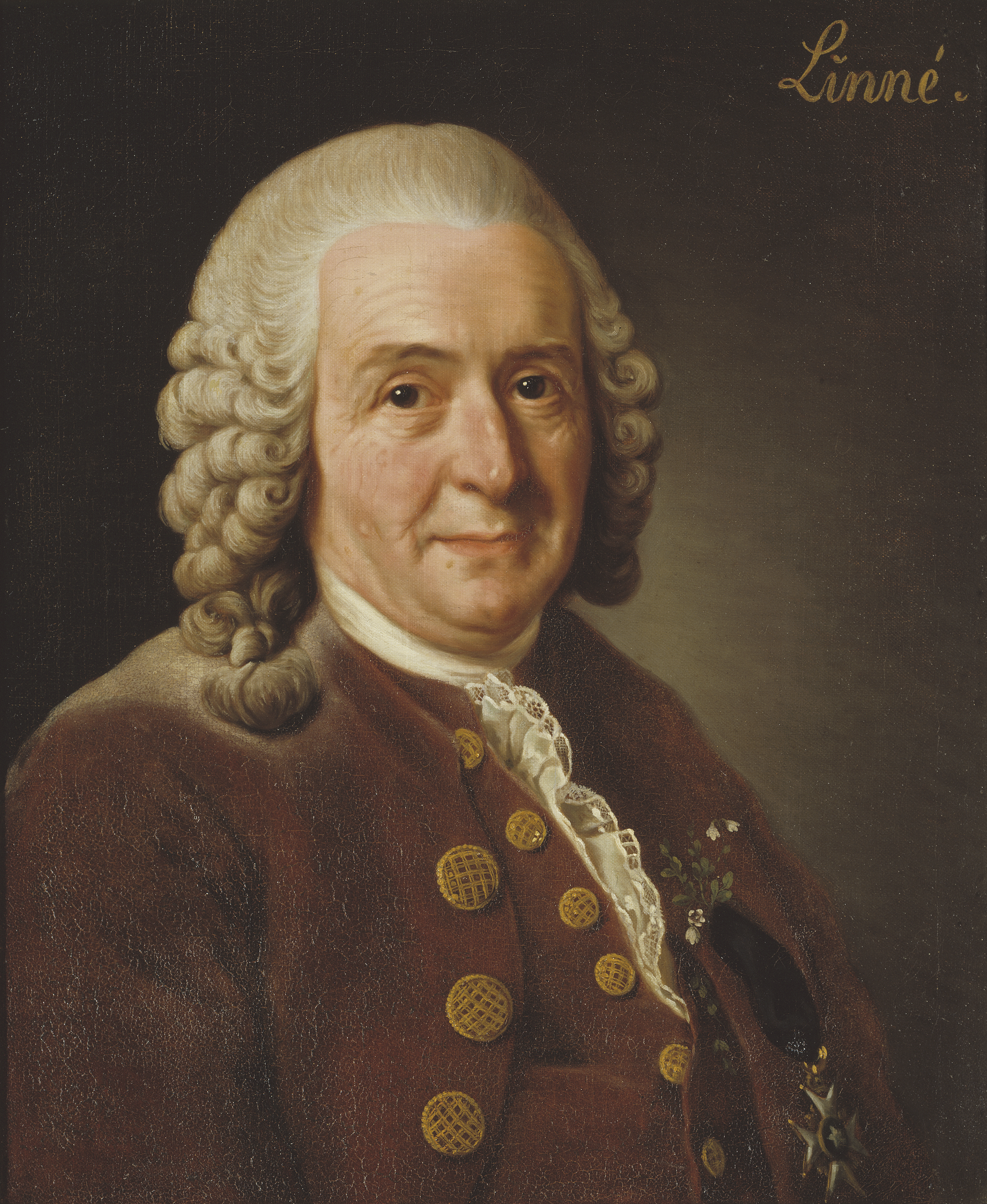
Carl Linnaeus coined the name Homo sapiens, and was later designated as the type for the species.

All modern humans are classified into the species Homo sapiens, coined by Carl Linnaeus in his 1735 work Systema Naturae. The generic name Homo is a learned 18th-century derivation from Latin homō, which refers to humans of either sex. The word human can refer to all members of the Homo genus. The name Homo sapiens means 'wise man' or 'knowledgeable man'. There is disagreement about whether certain extinct members of the genus, namely Neanderthals, should be included as a separate species of humans or as a subspecies of H. sapiens.

Human is a loanword of Middle English from Old French humain, ultimately from Latin hūmānus, the adjectival form of homō ('man' – in the sense of humanity). The native English term man can refer to the species generally (a synonym for humanity) as well as to human males. It may also refer to individuals of either sex.

Although the word animal is colloquially used as an antonym for human, contrary to a common biological misconception, humans are animals. The word person is often used interchangeably with human, but philosophical debate exists as to whether personhood applies to all humans or all sentient beings, and further if a human can lose personhood (such as by going into a persistent vegetative state) and what the beginning of human personhood is.

== Evolution ==
Humans belong to the biological family of great apes (family Hominidae, superfamily Hominoidea). The lineage of apes that eventually gave rise to humans first split from gibbons (family Hylobatidae), next orangutans (genus Pongo), then gorillas (genus Gorilla), and finally, chimpanzees and bonobos (genus Pan). The last split, between the human and chimpanzee–bonobo lineages, took place around 4-8 million years ago, in the late Miocene epoch. During this split, chromosome 2 was formed in humans from the joining of two other chromosomes, leaving humans with only 23 pairs of chromosomes, compared to 24 for the other apes. Following their split with chimpanzees and bonobos, the hominins diversified into many species and at least two distinct genera. All but one of these lineages – representing the genus Homo and its sole extant species Homo sapiens – are now extinct.

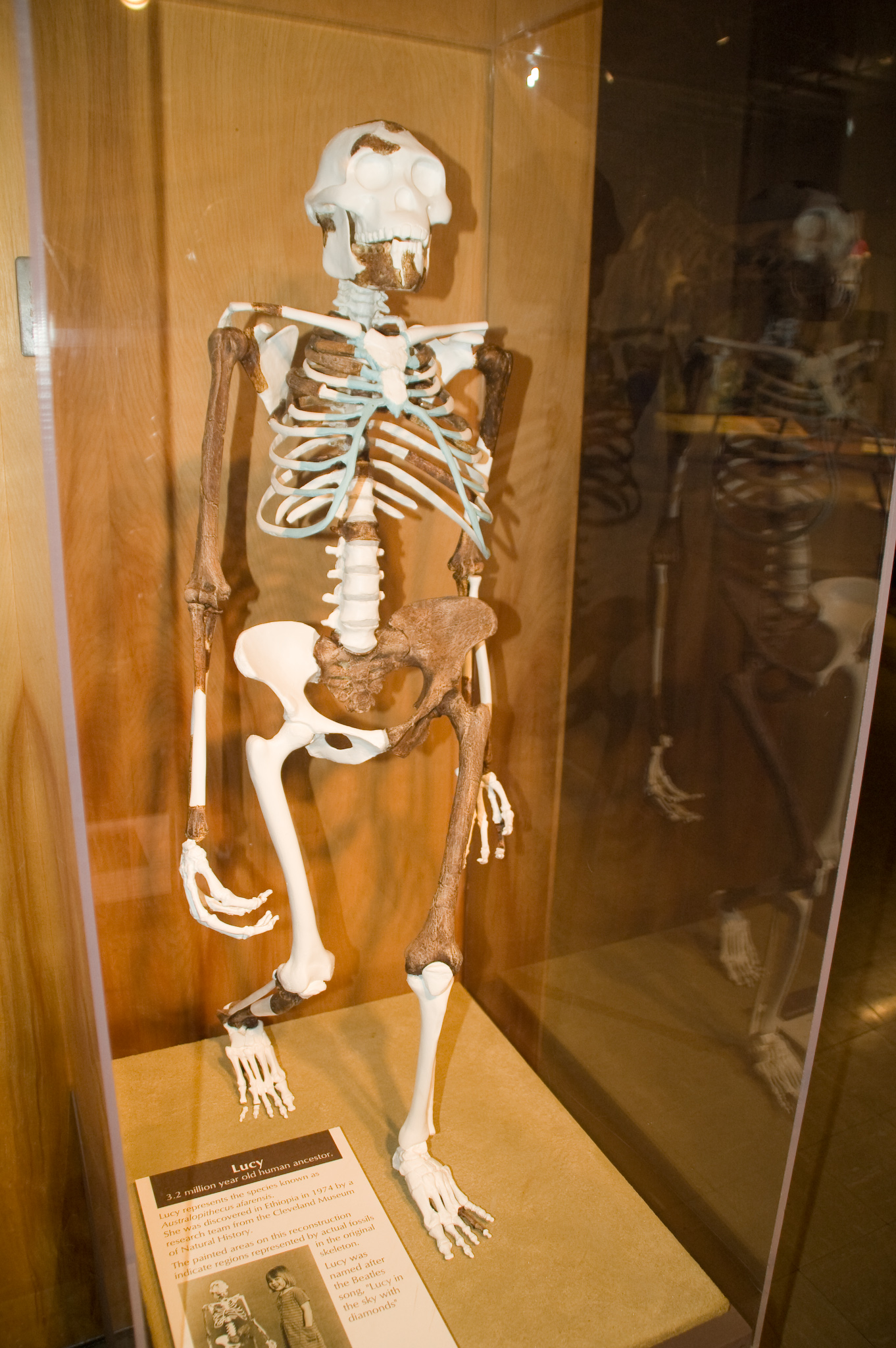
Reconstruction of Lucy, the first Australopithecus afarensis skeleton found

The genus Homo evolved from Australopithecus. Though fossils from the transition are scarce, the earliest members of Homo share several key traits with Australopithecus. Due to the scant available evidence, the time of the divergence to the genus Homo does not have a consensus. Some studies using molecular clock techniques estimate the Homo genus appeared 4.30–2.56 million years ago, while others contest that some early Homo species are incorrectly included in the genus and therefore put this estimate at about 1.87 million years ago.

The earliest record of Homo is the 2.8 million-year-old specimen LD 350-1 from Ethiopia, and the earliest named species are Homo habilis and Homo rudolfensis, which evolved by 2.3 million years ago. H. erectus (the African variant is sometimes called H. ergaster) evolved 2 million years ago and was the first archaic human species to leave Africa and disperse across Eurasia. H. erectus also was the first to evolve a characteristically human body plan. Homo sapiens emerged in Africa at least 300,000 years ago from a species commonly designated as either H. heidelbergensis or H. rhodesiensis, the descendants of H. erectus that remained in Africa. H. sapiens migrated out of the continent, gradually replacing or interbreeding with local populations of archaic humans. Humans began exhibiting behavioral modernity about 160,000–70,000 years ago, and possibly earlier. This development was likely selected amidst natural climate change in Middle to Late Pleistocene Africa.

The "out of Africa" migration took place in at least two waves, the first around 130,000 to 100,000 years ago, the second (Southern Dispersal) around 70,000 to 50,000 years ago. H. sapiens proceeded to colonize all the continents and larger islands except Antarctica, arriving in Eurasia 125,000 years ago, Australia around 65,000 years ago, the Americas around 15,000 years ago, and remote islands such as Hawaii, Easter Island, Madagascar, and New Zealand in the years 300 to 1280 CE.

Human evolution was not a simple linear or branched progression but involved interbreeding between related species. Genomic research has shown that hybridization between substantially diverged lineages was common in human evolution. DNA evidence suggests that several genes of Neanderthal origin are present among non-African populations and non-sub-Saharan African populations, and that Neanderthals and other hominins, such as Denisovans, may have contributed up to 6% of their genome to present-day non-African humans and non-sub-Saharan African humans.

Human evolution is characterized by a number of morphological, developmental, physiological, and behavioral changes that have taken place since the split between the last common ancestor of humans and chimpanzees. The most significant of these adaptations are hairlessness, obligate bipedalism, increased brain size, and decreased sexual dimorphism (neoteny). The relationship between all these changes is the subject of ongoing debate.

- Hominoidea (hominoids, apes)
  - Hylobatidae (gibbons)
  - Hominidae (hominids, great apes)
    - Ponginae
      - Pongo (orangutans)
        - Pongo abelii
        - - Pongo tapanuliensis
          - Pongo pygmaeus
    - Homininae (hominines)
      - Gorillini
        - Gorilla (gorillas)
          - Gorilla gorilla
          - Gorilla beringei
      - Hominini (hominins)
        - Panina
          - Pan (chimpanzees)
            - Pan troglodytes
            - Pan paniscus
        - - Hominina (homininans)
            Homo sapiens (humans)

== History ==
=== Prehistory ===
Overview of the peopling of the world by early human migration during the Upper Paleolithic, following the Southern Dispersal paradigm

Until about 12,000 years ago, all humans lived as hunter-gatherers. The Neolithic Revolution (the invention of agriculture) first took place in Southwest Asia and spread through large parts of the Old World over the following millennia. It also occurred independently in Mesoamerica (about 6,000 years ago), China, Papua New Guinea, Sudan and West Savanna regions of Africa.

The formation of permanent human settlements, the domestication of animals, and the use of metal tools were followed by a permanent food surplus, for the first time in history. Agriculture and a sedentary lifestyle led to the emergence of early civilizations.

=== Ancient ===
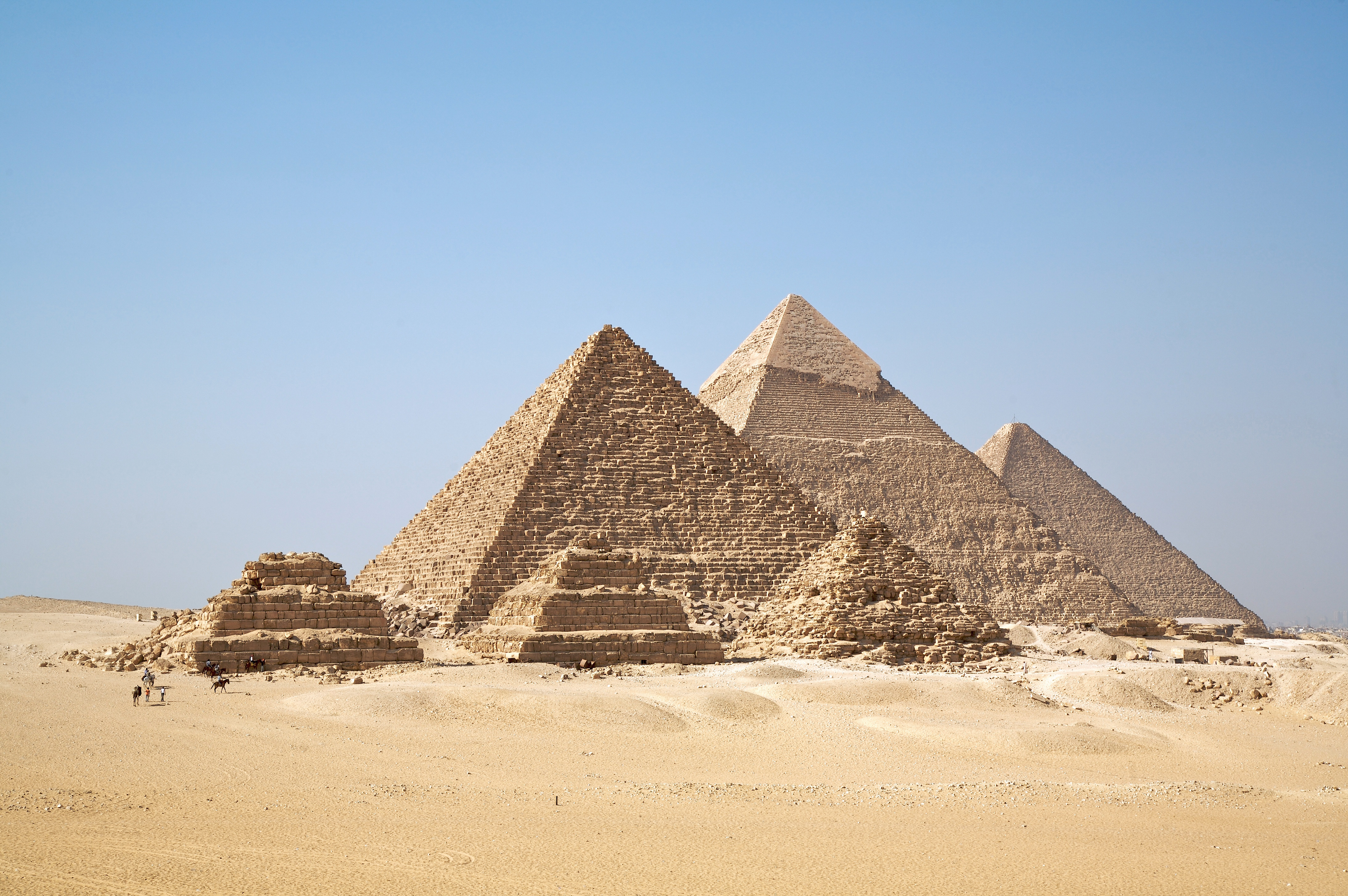
Great Pyramids of Giza, Egypt

An urban revolution took place in the 4th millennium BCE with the development of city-states, particularly Sumerian cities located in Mesopotamia. It was in these cities that the earliest known form of writing, cuneiform script, appeared around 3000 BCE. Other major civilizations to develop around this time were Ancient Egypt and the Indus Valley Civilization. They eventually traded with each other and invented technology such as wheels, plows and sails. Emerging by 3000 BCE, the Caral–Supe civilization is the oldest complex civilization in the Americas. Astronomy and mathematics were also developed, and the Great Pyramid of Giza was built. There is evidence of a severe drought lasting about a hundred years that may have caused the decline of these civilizations, with new ones appearing in the aftermath. Babylonians came to dominate Mesopotamia while others—such as the Poverty Point culture, Minoans, and the Shang dynasty—rose to prominence in new areas. The Late Bronze Age collapse around 1200 BCE resulted in the disappearance of a number of civilizations and the beginning of the Greek Dark Ages. During this period iron started replacing bronze, leading to the Iron Age.

In the 5th century BCE, history started being recorded as a discipline, which provided a much clearer picture of life at the time. Between the 8th and 6th centuries BCE, Europe entered the classical antiquity age, a period when ancient Greece and ancient Rome flourished. Around this time, other civilizations also came to prominence. The Maya civilization started to build cities and create complex calendars. In Africa, the Kingdom of Kush became the dominant power in Africa in the 7th century BC through its vast gold and iron resources, control over lucrative Nile trade routes, and formidable military strength. In West Asia, the Achaemenid Empire's system of centralized governance became the precursor to many later empires, while the Gupta Empire in India and the Han dynasty in China have been described as golden ages in their respective regions.

=== Post-classical ===
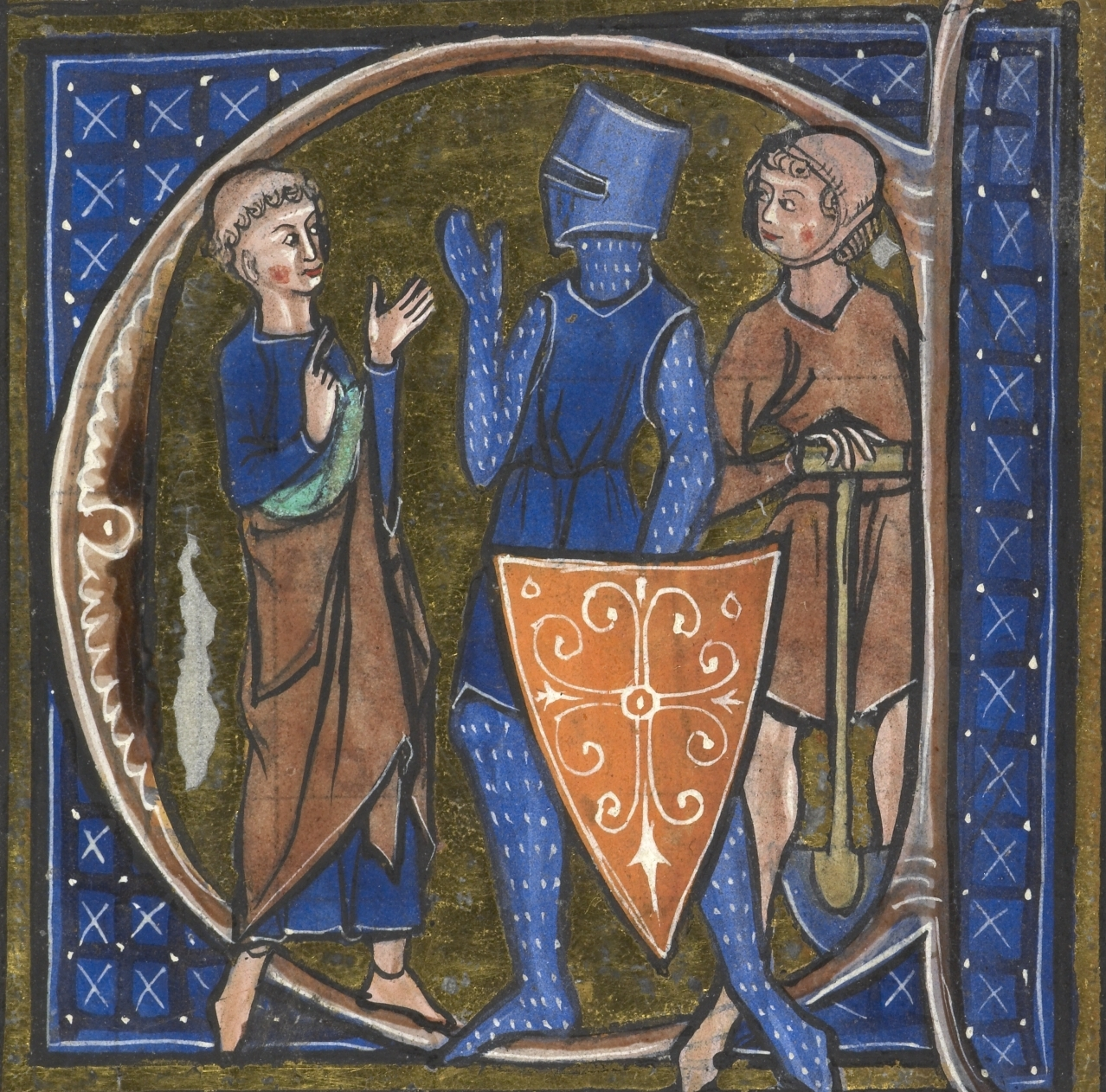
Medieval French manuscript illustration of the three classes of medieval society from the 13th-century Li Livres dou Santé

Following the fall of the Western Roman Empire in 476, Europe entered the Middle Ages. During this period, Christianity and the Church would act as a source of authority and education. In the Middle East, Islam became the prominent religion and expanded into North Africa. It led to an Islamic Golden Age, inspiring achievements in architecture, the revival of old advances in science and technology, and the formation of a distinct way of life. The Christian and Islamic worlds would eventually clash, with the Kingdom of England, the Kingdom of France, and the Holy Roman Empire declaring a series of holy wars to regain control of the Holy Land from Muslims.

In the Americas, between 200 and 900 CE, Mesoamerica was in its Classic Period, while further north, complex Mississippian societies would arise starting around 800 CE. The Mongol Empire would conquer much of Eurasia in the 13th and 14th centuries. Over this same time period, the Mali Empire in Africa grew to be the largest empire on the continent, stretching from Senegambia to Ivory Coast. Oceania would see the rise of the Tuʻi Tonga Empire, which expanded across many islands in the South Pacific. By the late 15th century, the Aztecs and Inca had become the dominant power in Mesoamerica and the Andes, respectively.

=== Modern ===
The early modern period in Europe and the Near East (c. 1450–1800) began with the final defeat of the Byzantine Empire and the rise of the Ottoman Empire. Meanwhile, Japan entered the Edo period, the Qing dynasty rose in China, and the Mughal Empire ruled much of India. Europe underwent the Renaissance, starting in the 15th century, and the Age of Discovery began with the exploration and colonization of new regions. This included the colonization of the Americas and the Columbian Exchange. This expansion led to the Atlantic slave trade and the genocide of the Americas' indigenous peoples. This period also marked the Scientific Revolution, with great advances in mathematics, mechanics, astronomy, and physiology.

Buzz Aldrin on the Moon during the 1969 Apollo 11 mission, as he and Neil Armstrong became the first humans to set foot on another celestial body

The late modern period (1800–present) saw the Industrial and Technological Revolution bring such discoveries as imaging technology, major innovations in transport, and energy development. Influenced by Enlightenment ideals, the Americas and Europe experienced a period of political revolutions known as the Age of Revolution. The Napoleonic Wars raged through Europe in the early 1800s, Spain lost most of its colonies in the New World, while Europeans continued expansion into Africa – where European control went from 10% to almost 90% in less than 50 years – and Oceania. In the 19th century, the British Empire expanded to become the world's largest empire.

A tenuous balance of power among European nations collapsed in 1914 with the outbreak of the First World War, one of the deadliest conflicts in history. In the 1930s, a worldwide economic crisis led to the rise of authoritarian regimes and a Second World War, involving almost all of the world's countries. The war's destruction led to the collapse of most global empires, leading to widespread decolonization.

Following the conclusion of the Second World War in 1945, the United States and the Soviet Union emerged as the remaining global superpowers. This led to a Cold War that saw a struggle for global influence, including a nuclear arms race and a space race, ending in the collapse of the Soviet Union. The current Information Age, spurred by the development of the Internet, sees the world becoming increasingly globalized and interconnected.

== Habitat and population ==
Population statistics
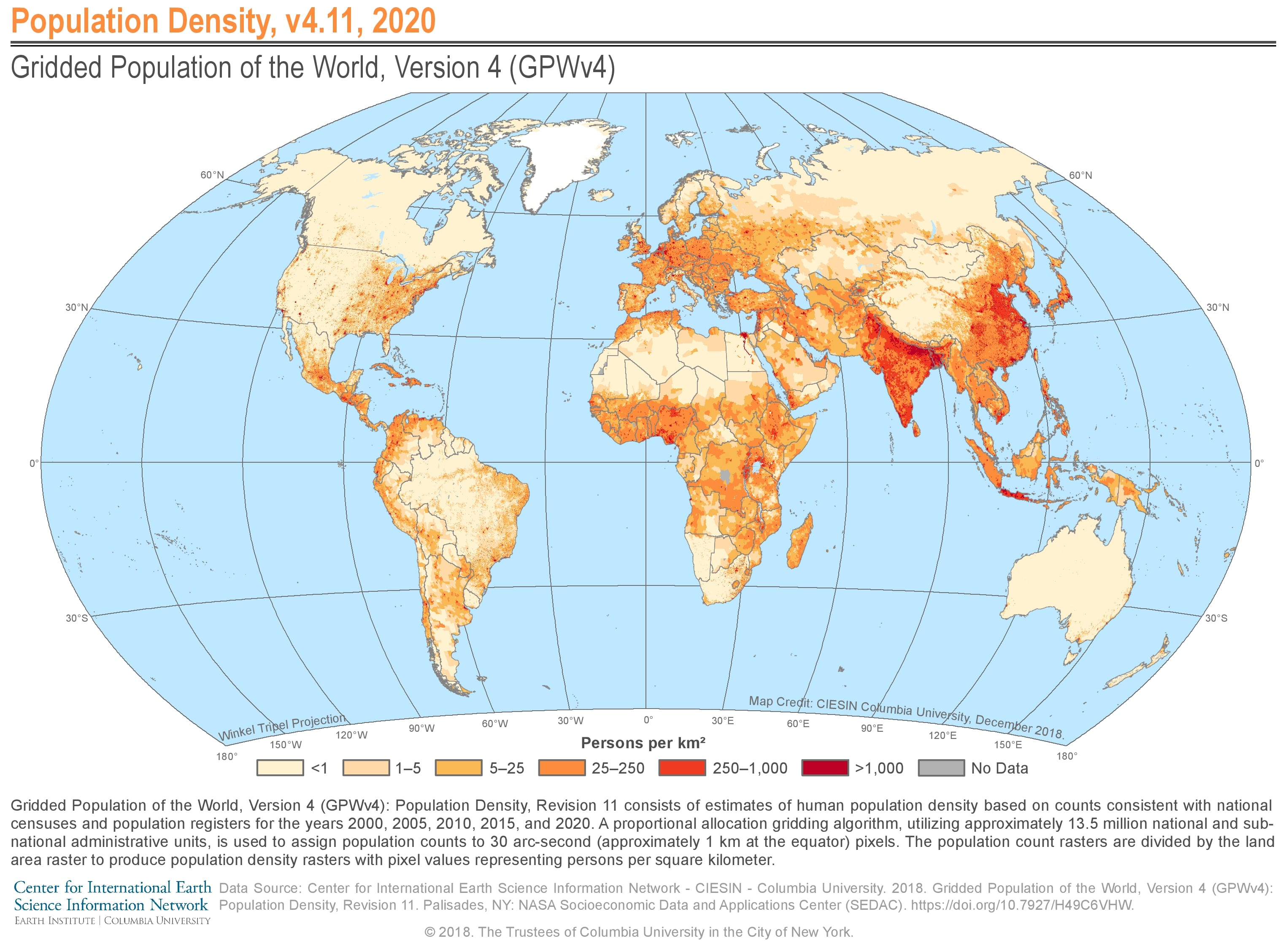
- Choropleth map showing Population density (people per square kilometer) estimates by 30 arc-second grid in 2020
- World population: ≈ 8.3 billion
- Population density: 16/km^{2} (42/sq mi) by total area 55/km^{2} (144/sq mi) by land area
- Largest cities (Note: Cities with over 10 million inhabitants as of 2018.): Tokyo, Delhi, Shanghai, São Paulo, Mexico City, Cairo, Mumbai, Beijing, Dhaka, Osaka

Early human settlements were dependent on proximity to water and – depending on the lifestyle – other natural resources used for subsistence, such as populations of animal prey for hunting and arable land for growing crops and grazing livestock. Modern humans, however, have a great capacity for altering their habitats by means of technology, irrigation, urban planning, construction, deforestation and desertification. Human settlements continue to be vulnerable to natural disasters, especially those placed in hazardous locations and with low quality of construction. Grouping and deliberate habitat alteration are often done with the goals of providing protection, accumulating comforts or material wealth, expanding the available food, improving aesthetics, increasing knowledge, or enhancing the exchange of resources.

Humans are one of the most adaptable species, despite having a low or narrow tolerance for many of the Earth's extreme environments. Currently the species is present in all eight biogeographical realms, although their presence in the Antarctic realm is limited to research stations, and annually there is a population decline in the winter months of this realm. Humans have had a dramatic effect on the environment. Human population growth, industrialization, land development, overconsumption, and combustion of fossil fuels have led to environmental destruction and pollution that significantly contributes to the ongoing mass extinction of other forms of life.

Within the last century, humans have also explored the deep sea and outer space. Human habitation within these hostile environments is restrictive and expensive, typically limited in duration, and restricted to scientific, military, or industrial expeditions. Humans have visited the Moon and made their presence known on other celestial bodies through human-made robotic spacecraft. Since 2000, there has been continuous human presence in space through habitation on the International Space Station.

By using advanced tools and clothing, humans have been able to extend their tolerance to a wide variety of temperatures, humidities, and altitudes. As a result, humans are a cosmopolitan species found in almost all regions of the world, including tropical rainforests, arid deserts, extremely cold Arctic regions, and heavily polluted cities; in comparison, most other species are confined to a few geographical areas by their limited adaptability. The human population is not, however, uniformly distributed on the Earth's surface, because the population density varies from one region to another, and large stretches of surface are almost completely uninhabited, like Antarctica and vast swathes of the ocean. Most humans (61%) live in Asia; the remainder live in the Americas (14%), Africa (14%), Europe (11%), and Oceania (0.5%).

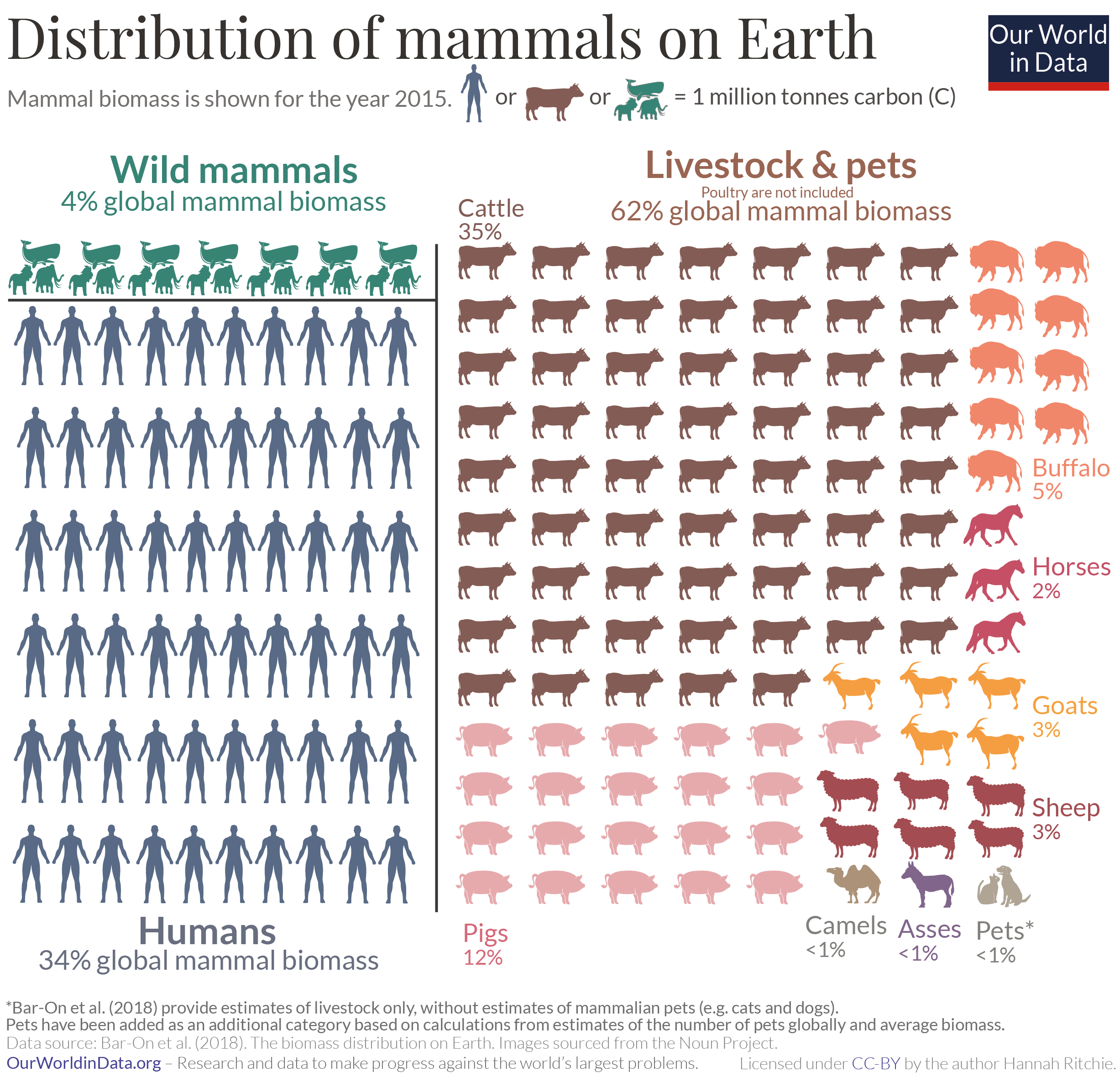
Humans and their domesticated animals represent 96% of all mammalian biomass on Earth, whereas all wild mammals represent only 4%.

Estimates of the population at the time agriculture emerged in around 10,000 BC have ranged between 1 million and 15 million. Around 50–60 million people lived in the combined eastern and western Roman Empire in the 4th century AD. Bubonic plagues, first recorded in the 6th century AD, reduced the population by 50%, with the Black Death killing 75–200 million people in Eurasia and North Africa alone. The human population is believed to have reached one billion in 1800. It has since then increased exponentially, reaching two billion in 1930 and three billion in 1960, four in 1975, five in 1987, and six billion in 1999. It passed seven billion in 2011 and passed eight billion in 2022. It took over two million years of human prehistory and history for the human population to reach one billion, and only 207 years more to grow to 7 billion. The combined biomass of the carbon of all the humans on Earth in 2018 was estimated at 60 million tons, about 10 times larger than that of all non-domesticated mammals.

In 2018, 4.2 billion humans (55%) lived in urban areas, up from 751 million in 1950. The most urbanized regions are Northern America (82%), Latin America (81%), Europe (74%), and Oceania (68%), with Africa and Asia having nearly 90% of the world's 3.4 billion rural population. Problems for humans living in cities include various forms of pollution and crime, especially in inner-city and suburban slums.

== Biology ==
=== Anatomy and physiology ===
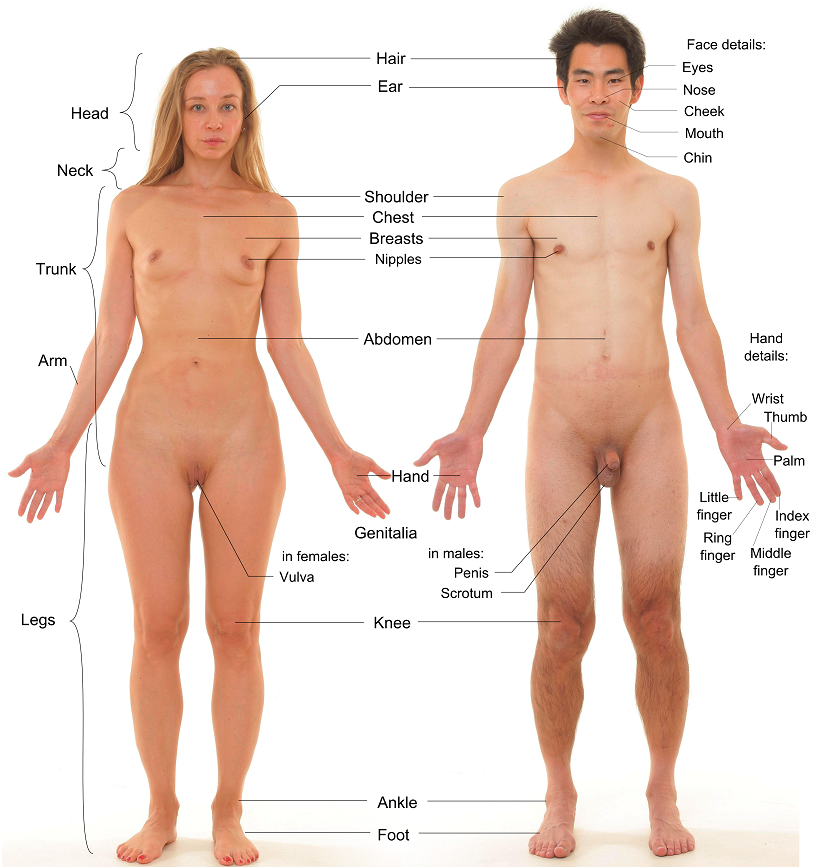
Basic anatomical features of female and male humans. These models have had body hair and male facial hair removed and head hair trimmed.

Most aspects of human physiology are closely homologous to corresponding aspects of animal physiology. The dental formula of humans is: 2.1.2.32.1.2.3, like other catarrhines. Humans have proportionately shorter palates and much smaller teeth than other primates. They are the only primates to have short, relatively flush canine teeth. Humans have characteristically crowded teeth, with gaps from lost teeth usually closing up quickly in young individuals. Humans are gradually losing their third molars, with some individuals having them congenitally absent.

Humans share with chimpanzees a vestigial tail, appendix, flexible shoulder joints, grasping fingers and opposable thumbs. Humans also have a more barrel-shaped chest in contrast to the funnel shape of other apes, an adaptation for bipedal respiration. Apart from bipedalism and brain size, humans differ from chimpanzees mostly in smelling, hearing, and digesting proteins. While humans have a density of hair follicles comparable to other apes, it is predominantly vellus hair, most of which is so short and wispy as to be practically invisible. Humans have about 2 million sweat glands spread over their entire bodies, many more than chimpanzees, whose sweat glands are scarce and are mainly located on the palm of the hand and on the soles of the feet.

It is estimated that the worldwide average height for an adult human male is about 171 cm (5 ft 7 in), while the worldwide average height for adult human females is about 159 cm (5 ft 3 in). After birth, human growth proceeds slowly compared to other primates until puberty, where growth accelerates for a few years. Shrinkage of stature may begin in middle age in some individuals but tends to be typical in the extremely aged. Throughout history, human populations have universally become taller, probably as a consequence of better nutrition, healthcare, and living conditions. The average mass of an adult human is 59 kg (130 lb) for females and 77 kg (170 lb) for males. Like many other conditions, body weight and body type are influenced by both genetic susceptibility and environment and vary greatly among individuals.

Humans have a far faster and more accurate throw than other animals. Humans are also among the best long-distance runners in the animal kingdom, but slower over short distances. Humans' thinner body hair and more productive sweat glands help avoid heat exhaustion while running for long distances. Compared to other apes, the human heart produces greater stroke volume and cardiac output, and the aorta is proportionately larger.

=== Genetics ===
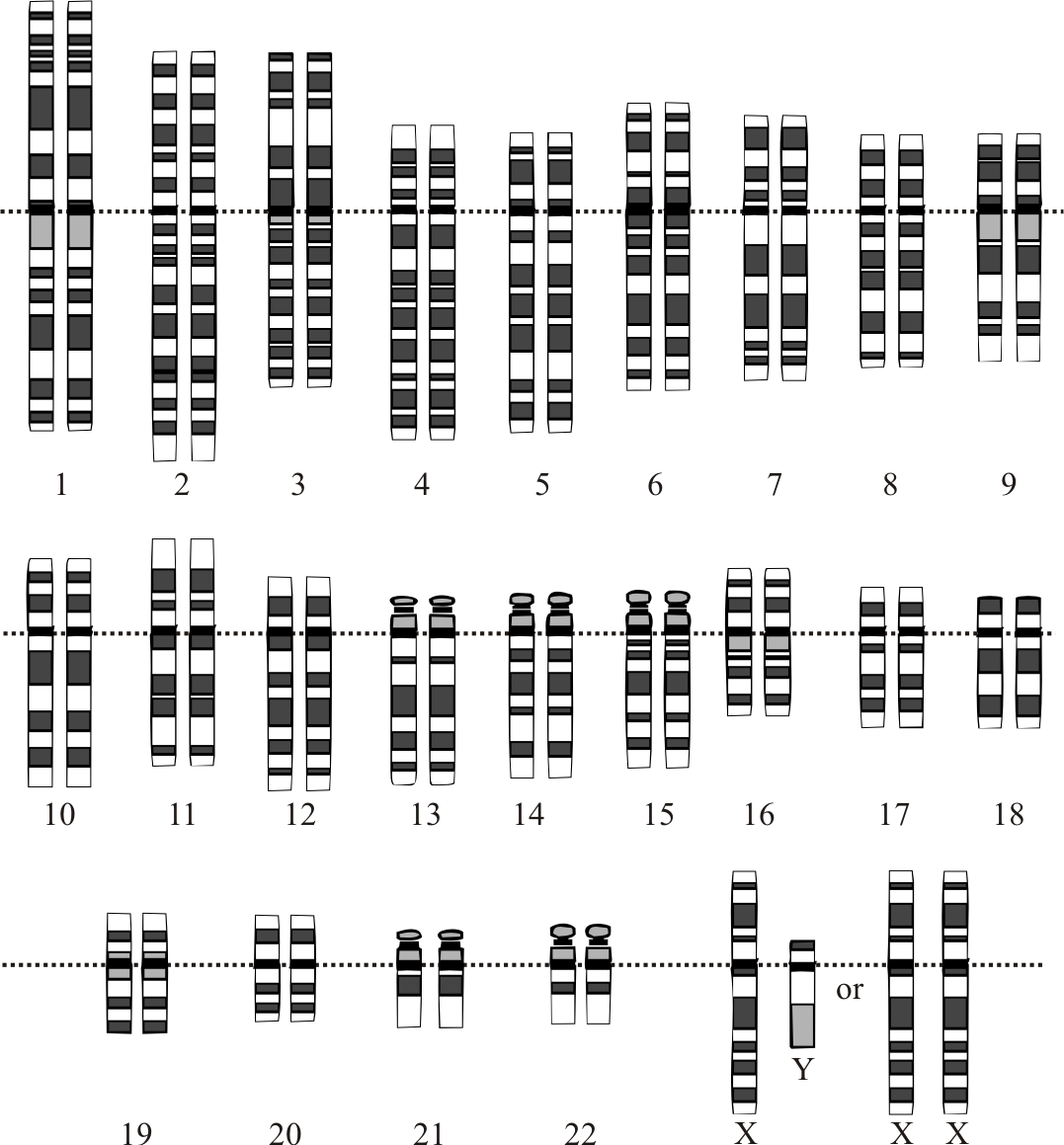
A graphical representation of the standard human karyotype, including both the female (XX) and male (XY) sex chromosomes

Humans are, like all animals, plants, and fungi, a eukaryotic species, and like most animals, a diploid species. Each somatic cell has two sets of 23 chromosomes, each set received from one parent; gametes have only one set of chromosomes, which is a mixture of the two parental sets. Among the 23 pairs of chromosomes, there are 22 pairs of autosomes and one pair of sex chromosomes. In humans, sex determination is primarily mediated by the SRY gene located on the Y chromosome. While the typical configuration follows an XY sex-determination system (XX for females, XY for males), the genetic expression of the Sex-determining Region Y protein is the critical factor in initiating male gonadal differentiation. Consequently, individuals may be born with a chromosomal genotype that does not align with their phenotypic sex, a condition often resulting in infertility due to the absence of specific genes required for gametogenesis. Genes and environment influence human biological variation in visible characteristics, physiology, disease susceptibility and mental abilities. The exact influence of genes and environment on certain traits is not well understood.

While no humans – not even monozygotic twins – are genetically identical, two humans on average will have a genetic similarity of 99.5%-99.9%. This makes them more homogeneous than other great apes, including chimpanzees. This small variation in human DNA compared to many other species suggests a population bottleneck during the Late Pleistocene (around 100,000 years ago), in which the human population was reduced to a small number of breeding pairs. The forces of natural selection have continued to operate on human populations, with evidence that certain regions of the genome display directional selection in the past 15,000 years.

The majority of the human genome was first sequenced in 2001, with complete sequencing accomplished in 2022. As of 2023, it was estimated that humans have around 19,500 protein-coding genes, with many different variants, and an unknown number of non-coding RNA genes. African populations harbor the highest number of private genetic variants. While many of the common variants found in populations outside of Africa are also found on the African continent, there are still large numbers that are private to these regions, especially Oceania and the Americas. By comparing mitochondrial DNA, which is inherited only from the mother, geneticists have concluded that the last female common ancestor whose genetic marker is found in all modern humans, the so-called mitochondrial Eve, must have lived around 90,000 to 200,000 years ago.

=== Life cycle ===
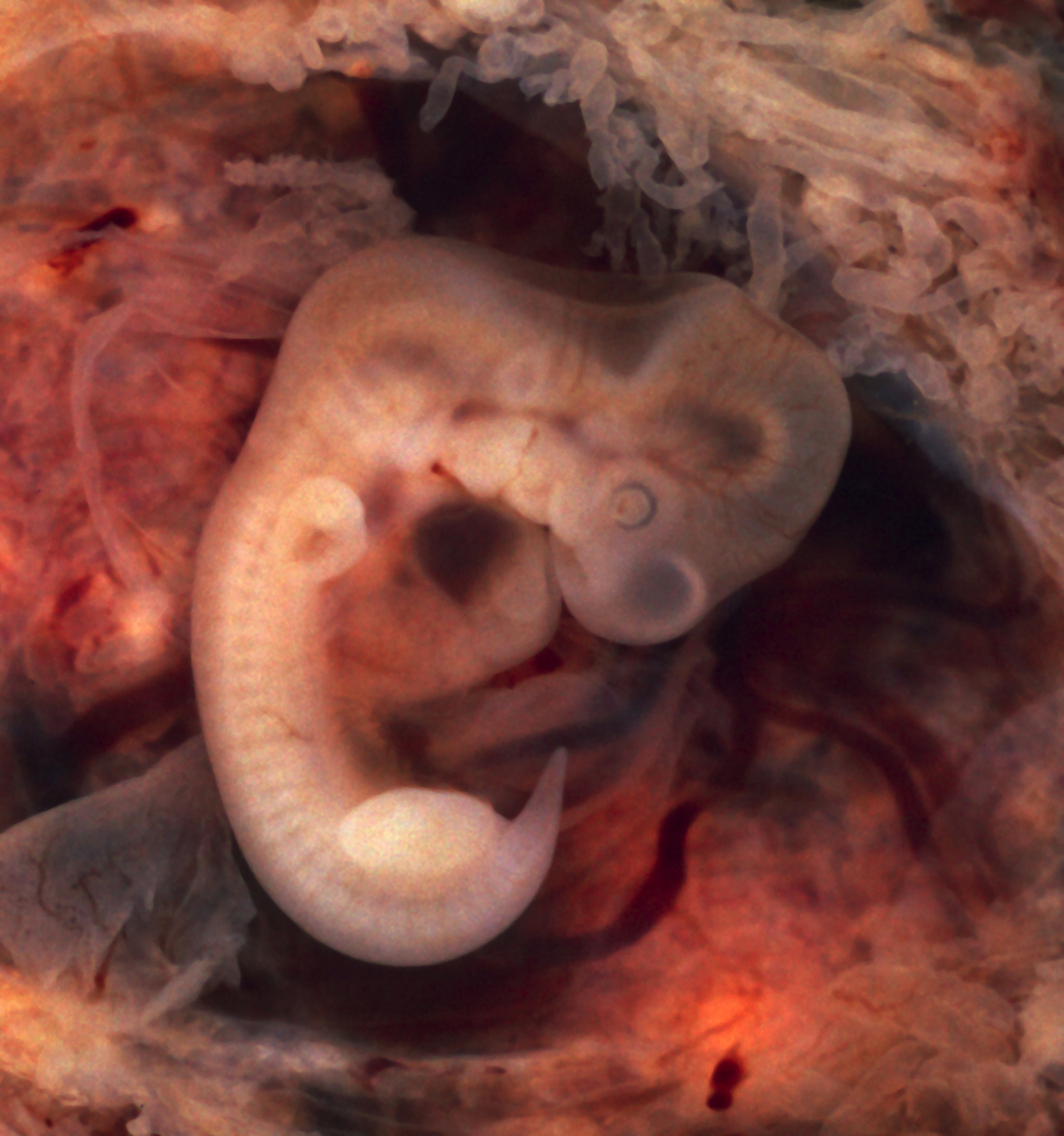
A 10 mm human embryo at 5 weeks

Most human reproduction takes place by internal fertilization via sexual intercourse, but can also occur through assisted reproductive technology procedures. The average gestation period is 38 weeks, but a normal pregnancy can vary by up to 37 days. Embryonic development in humans covers the first eight weeks of development; at the beginning of the ninth week the embryo is termed a fetus. Humans are able to induce early labor or perform a caesarean section if the child needs to be born earlier for medical reasons. In developed countries, infants are typically 3–4 kg (7–9 lb) in weight and 47–53 cm (19–21 in) in height at birth. However, low birth weight is common in developing countries, and it contributes to the high levels of infant mortality in these regions.

Compared with other species, human childbirth is dangerous, with a much higher risk of complications and death. The size of the fetus's head is more closely matched to the pelvis than in other primates. The reason for this is not completely understood, (Note: Traditionally, this has been explained by conflicting evolutionary pressures involved in bipedalism and encephalization, the so-called obstetrical dilemma, but recent research suggests other factors may be at play.) but it contributes to a painful labor that can last 24 hours or more. The chances of a successful labor increased significantly during the 20th century in wealthier countries with the advent of new medical technologies. In contrast, pregnancy and natural childbirth remain hazardous ordeals in developing regions of the world, with maternal death rates approximately 100 times greater than in developed countries.

Both the mother and the father provide care for human offspring, in contrast to other primates, where parental care is mostly done by the mother. Helpless at birth, humans continue to grow for some years, typically reaching sexual maturity at 15 to 17 years of age. The human life span has been split into various stages ranging from three to twelve. Common stages include infancy, childhood, adolescence, adulthood and old age. The lengths of these stages have varied across cultures and time periods but are typified by an unusually rapid growth spurt during adolescence. Human females undergo menopause and become infertile at around the age of 50. It has been proposed that menopause increases a woman's overall reproductive success by allowing her to invest more time and resources in her existing offspring, and in turn their children (the grandmother hypothesis), rather than by continuing to bear children into old age.

The life span of an individual depends on two major factors, genetics and lifestyle choices. For various reasons, including biological/genetic causes, women live on average about four years longer than men. As of 2018, the global average life expectancy at birth of a girl is estimated to be 74.9 years compared to 70.4 for a boy. There are significant geographical variations in human life expectancy, mostly correlated with economic development – for example, life expectancy at birth in Hong Kong is 87.6 years for girls and 81.8 for boys, while in the Central African Republic, it is 55.0 years for girls and 50.6 for boys. The developed world is generally aging, with the median age around 40 years. In the developing world, the median age is between 15 and 20 years. While one in five Europeans is 60 years of age or older, only one in twenty Africans is 60 years of age or older. In 2012, the United Nations estimated that there were 316,600 living centenarians (humans of age 100 or older) worldwide.

Human life stages
Infant boy and girl	Boy and girl before puberty (children)	Adolescent male and female	Adult man and woman	Elderly man and woman

=== Diet ===
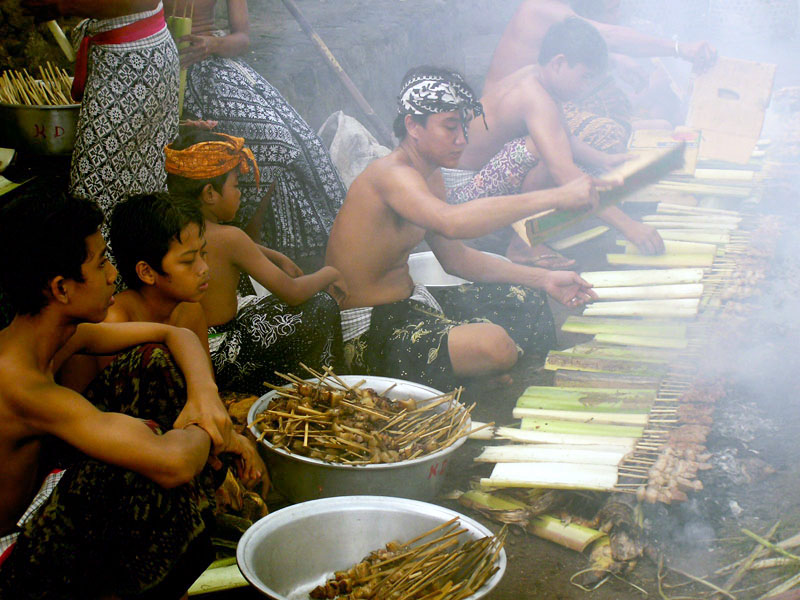
Humans preparing a meal in Bali, Indonesia

Humans are omnivorous, opportunistic feeders capable of consuming a wide variety of plant and animal material. Human groups have adopted a range of diets from purely vegan to primarily carnivorous. In some cases, dietary restrictions in humans can lead to deficiency diseases; however, stable human groups have adapted to many dietary patterns through both genetic specialization and cultural conventions to use nutritionally balanced food sources. Diet plays a large role in shaping the gut microbiome, which in turn affects human health. The human diet is prominently reflected in human culture and has led to the development of food science.

Until the development of agriculture, Homo sapiens employed a hunter-gatherer method as their sole means of food collection. This involved combining stationary food sources (such as fruits, grains, tubers, and mushrooms, insect larvae, and aquatic mollusks) with wild game, which must be hunted and captured in order to be consumed. It has been proposed that humans have used fire to prepare and cook food since the time of Homo erectus. Human domestication of wild plants began about 11,700 years ago, leading to the development of agriculture, a gradual process called the Neolithic Revolution. These dietary changes may also have altered human biology; the spread of dairy farming provided a new and rich source of food, leading to the evolution of the ability to digest lactose in some adults. The types of food consumed, and how they are prepared, have varied widely by time, location, and culture.

In general, humans can survive for up to eight weeks without food, depending on stored body fat. Survival without water is usually limited to three or four days, with a maximum of one week. In 2020, it was estimated that 9 million humans die every year from causes directly or indirectly related to starvation. Childhood malnutrition is also common and contributes to the global burden of disease. However, global food distribution is not even, and obesity among some human populations has increased rapidly, leading to health complications and increased mortality in some developed and a few developing countries. Worldwide, over one billion people are obese, with 16.2% of the population classified as overweight in 2024. Obesity is caused by consuming more calories than are expended, so excessive weight gain is usually caused by an energy-dense diet.

Food consumption is the first step of the digestive process, in which humans ultimately expel feces between three times per day and three times per week, with higher frequency in early childhood. Diet strongly affects the composition of human waste and the rate of its evacuation.

=== Biological variation ===
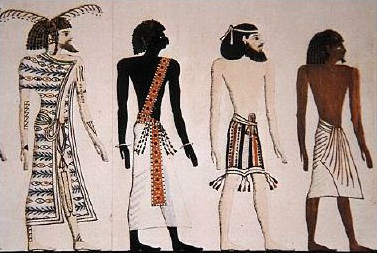
A Libyan, a Nubian, a Syrian, and an Egyptian, drawing by an unknown artist after a mural of the tomb of Seti I, copied by Heinrich von Minutoli (1820). Note the skin shades were colored in by the 19th century illustrator, the original Ancient Egyptian mural is heavily faded.

There is biological variation in the human species – with traits such as blood type, genetic diseases, cranial features, facial features, organ systems, eye color, hair color and texture, height and build, and skin color varying across the globe. The typical height of an adult human is between 1.4 and 1.9 m (4 ft 7 in and 6 ft 3 in), although this varies significantly depending on sex, ethnic origin, and family bloodlines. Body size is partly determined by genes and is also significantly influenced by environmental factors such as diet, exercise, and sleep patterns.

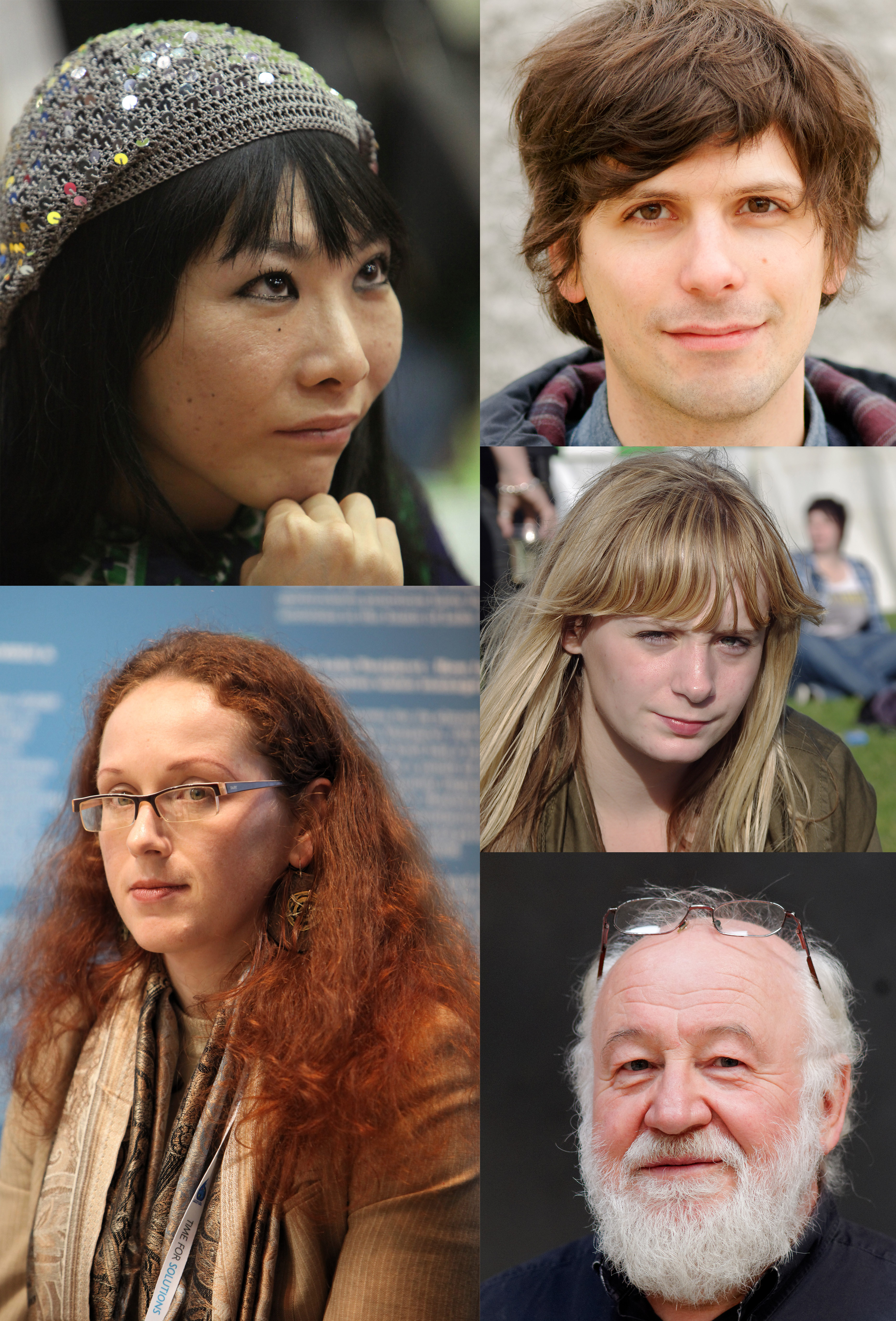
A variety of human hair colors; from top left, clockwise: black, brown, blonde, white, red

There is evidence that populations have adapted genetically to various external factors. The genes that allow adult humans to digest lactose are present in high frequencies in populations that have long histories of cattle domestication and are more dependent on cow milk. Sickle cell anemia, which may provide increased resistance to malaria, is frequent in populations where malaria is endemic. Populations that have for a very long time inhabited specific climates tend to have developed specific phenotypes that are beneficial for those environments – short stature and stocky build in cold regions, tall and lanky in hot regions, and with high lung capacities or other adaptations at high altitudes. Some populations have evolved highly unique adaptations to very specific environmental conditions, such as those advantageous to ocean-dwelling lifestyles and freediving in the Bajau.

Human hair ranges in color from red to blond to brown to black, which is the most frequent. Hair color depends on the amount of melanin, with concentrations fading with increased age, leading to grey or even white hair. Skin color can range from darkest brown to lightest peach, or even nearly white or colorless in cases of albinism. It tends to vary clinally and generally correlates with the level of ultraviolet radiation in a particular geographic area, with darker skin mostly around the equator. Skin darkening may have evolved as protection against ultraviolet solar radiation. Light skin pigmentation protects against depletion of vitamin D, which requires sunlight to make. Human skin also has a capacity to darken (tan) in response to exposure to ultraviolet radiation.

There is relatively little variation between human geographical populations, and most of the variation that occurs is at the individual level. Much of human variation is continuous, often with no clear points of demarcation. Genetic data shows that no matter how population groups are defined, two people from the same population group are almost as different from each other as two people from any two different population groups. Dark-skinned populations that are found in Africa, Australia, and South Asia are not closely related to each other.

Genetic research has demonstrated that human populations native to the African continent are the most genetically diverse and genetic diversity decreases with migratory distance from Africa, possibly the result of bottlenecks during human migration. These non-African populations acquired new genetic inputs from local admixture with archaic populations and have much greater variation from Neanderthals and Denisovans than is found in Africa, though Neanderthal admixture into African populations may be underestimated. Furthermore, recent studies have found that populations in sub-Saharan Africa, and particularly West Africa, have ancestral genetic variation which predates modern humans and has been lost in most non-African populations. Some of this ancestry is thought to originate from admixture with an unknown archaic hominin that diverged before the split of Neanderthals and modern humans.

Humans are a gonochoric species, meaning they are divided into male and female sexes. The greatest degree of genetic variation exists between males and females. While the nucleotide genetic variation of individuals of the same sex across global populations is no greater than 0.1%–0.5%, the genetic difference between males and females is between 1% and 2%. Males on average are 15% heavier and 15 cm (6 in) taller than females. On average, males have about 40–50% more upper-body strength and 20–30% more lower-body strength than females at the same weight, due to higher amounts of muscle and larger muscle fibers. Females generally have a higher body fat percentage than males. Females have lighter skin than males of the same population; this has been explained by a higher need for vitamin D in females during pregnancy and lactation. As there are chromosomal differences between females and males, some X- and Y-chromosome-related conditions and disorders only affect either males or females. After allowing for body weight and volume, the male voice is on average an octave deeper than the female voice. Females have a longer life span in almost every population around the world. There are intersex variations in the human population; estimates range from 0.018% to 1.7%.

== Psychology ==
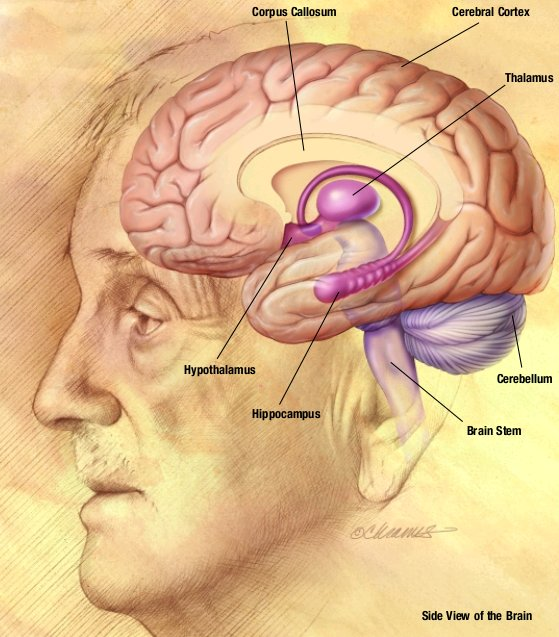
Drawing of the human brain, showing several important structures

The human brain is the locus of "higher" order functioning such as thought, reasoning, and abstraction. These cognitive processes constitute the mind, and, along with their behavioral consequences, are studied in the field of psychology. Humans have a larger and more developed prefrontal cortex than other primates, the region of the brain associated with higher cognition. This has led humans to proclaim themselves to be more intelligent than any other known species. Objectively defining intelligence is difficult, with other animals adapting senses and excelling in areas that humans are unable to.

There are some traits that, although not strictly unique, do set humans apart from other animals. Humans may be the only animals who have episodic memory and who can engage in "mental time travel". Even compared with other social animals, humans have an unusually high degree of flexibility in their facial expressions. Humans are the only animals known to cry emotional tears. Humans are one of the few animals able to self-recognize in mirror tests, and there is also debate over to what extent humans are the only animals with a theory of mind.

=== Sleep and dreaming ===
Humans are generally diurnal. The average sleep requirement is between seven and nine hours per day for an adult and nine to ten hours per day for a child; elderly people usually sleep for six to seven hours. Having less sleep than this is common among humans, even though sleep deprivation can have negative health effects. A sustained restriction of adult sleep to four hours per day has been shown to correlate with changes in physiology and mental state, including reduced memory, fatigue, aggression, and bodily discomfort.

During sleep humans dream, where they experience sensory images and sounds. Dreaming is stimulated by the pons and mostly occurs during the rapid eye movement (REM) phase of sleep. The length of a dream can vary, from a few seconds up to 30 minutes. Humans have three to five dreams per night, and some may have up to seven. Dreamers are more likely to remember the dream if awakened during the REM phase. The events in dreams are generally outside the control of the dreamer, with the exception of lucid dreaming, where the dreamer is self-aware. Dreams can at times make a creative thought occur or give a sense of inspiration, as is the case with some notable works of fiction, scientific concepts, and art.

=== Consciousness and thought ===
Human consciousness, at its simplest, is sentience or awareness of internal or external existence. Despite centuries of analyses, definitions, explanations and debates by philosophers and scientists, the underlying nature of consciousness remains enigmatic and poorly understood, being "at once the most familiar and most mysterious aspect of our lives". The only widely agreed notion about the topic is the intuition that it exists. Opinions differ about what exactly needs to be studied and explained as consciousness. Some philosophers divide consciousness into phenomenal consciousness, which is sensory experience itself, and access consciousness, which can be used for reasoning or directly controlling actions. It is sometimes synonymous with 'the mind', and at other times, an aspect of it. Historically it is associated with introspection, private thought, imagination, and volition. It now often includes some kind of experience, cognition, feeling or perception. It may be 'awareness', or 'awareness of awareness', or self-awareness. There might be different levels or orders of consciousness, or different kinds of consciousness, or just one kind with different features.

The process of acquiring knowledge and understanding through thought, experience, and the senses is known as cognition. The human brain perceives the external world through the senses, and each individual human is influenced greatly by their experiences, leading to subjective views of existence and the passage of time. The nature of thought is central to psychology and related fields. Cognitive psychology studies cognition, the mental processes underlying behavior. Largely focusing on the development of the human mind through the life span, developmental psychology seeks to understand how people come to perceive, understand, and act within the world and how these processes change as they age. This may focus on intellectual, cognitive, neural, social, or moral development. Psychologists have developed intelligence tests and the concept of intelligence quotient in order to assess the relative intelligence of human beings and study its distribution among the population.

=== Motivation and emotion ===
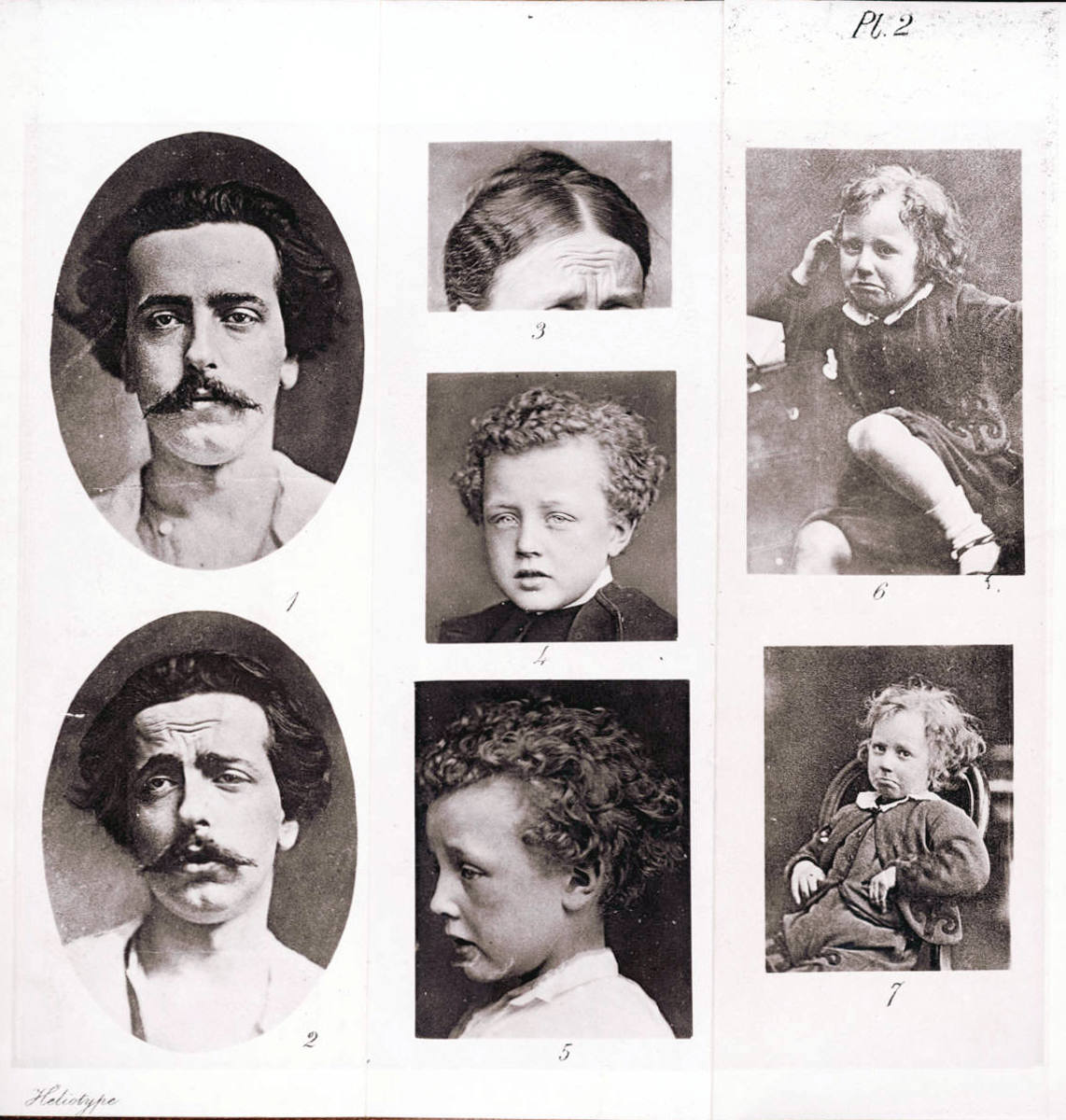
Illustration of grief from Charles Darwin's 1872 book The Expression of the Emotions in Man and Animals

Human motivation is not yet wholly understood. From a psychological perspective, Maslow's hierarchy of needs is a well-established theory that can be defined as the process of satisfying certain needs in ascending order of complexity. From a more general, philosophical perspective, human motivation can be defined as a commitment to, or withdrawal from, various goals requiring the application of human ability. Furthermore, incentive and preference are both factors, as are any perceived links between incentives and preferences. Volition may also be involved, in which case willpower is also a factor. Ideally, both motivation and volition ensure the selection, striving for, and realization of goals in an optimal manner, a function beginning in childhood and continuing throughout a lifetime in a process known as socialization.

Emotions are biological states associated with the nervous system brought on by neurophysiological changes variously associated with thoughts, feelings, behavioral responses, and a degree of pleasure or displeasure. They are often intertwined with mood, temperament, personality, disposition, creativity, and motivation. Emotion has a significant influence on human behavior and their ability to learn. Acting on extreme or uncontrolled emotions can lead to social disorder and crime, with studies showing criminals may have lower emotional intelligence than normal.

Emotional experiences perceived as pleasant, such as joy, interest, or contentment, contrast with those perceived as unpleasant, like anxiety, sadness, anger, and despair. Happiness, or the state of being happy, is a human emotional condition. The definition of happiness is a common philosophical topic. Some define it as experiencing the feeling of positive emotional affects, while avoiding the negative ones. Others see it as an appraisal of life satisfaction or quality of life. Recent research suggests that being happy might involve experiencing some negative emotions when humans feel they are warranted.

=== Sexuality and love ===
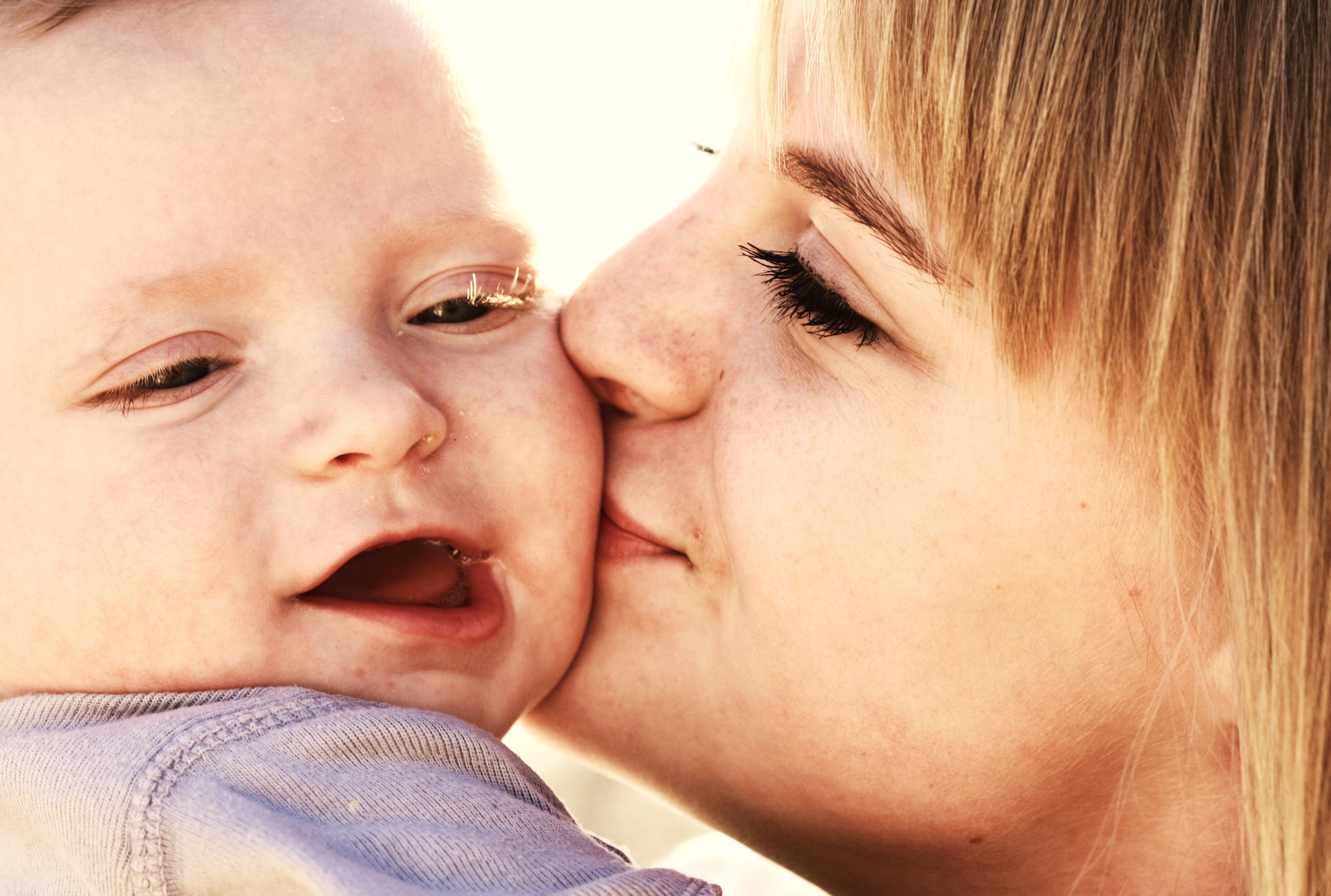
Human parents often display familial love for their children.

For humans, sexuality involves biological, erotic, physical, emotional, social, or spiritual feelings and behaviors. Because it is a broad term that has varied with historical contexts over time, it lacks a precise definition. The biological and physical aspects of sexuality largely concern the human reproductive functions, including the human sexual response cycle. Sexuality also affects and is affected by cultural, political, legal, philosophical, moral, ethical, and religious aspects of life. Sexual desire (libido) is a basic mental state present at the beginning of sexual behavior. Studies have found that men report stronger sexual desire than women and masturbate more frequently.

Humans can fall anywhere along a continuous scale of sexual orientation, although most humans are heterosexual. While homosexual behavior occurs in some other animals, only humans and domestic sheep have so far been found to exhibit exclusive preference for same-sex relationships. Most evidence supports nonsocial, biological causes of sexual orientation, as cultures that are very tolerant of homosexuality do not have significantly higher rates of it. Research in neuroscience and genetics suggests that other aspects of human sexuality are biologically influenced as well.

Love most commonly refers to a feeling of strong attraction or emotional attachment. It can be impersonal (the love of an object, ideal, or strong political or spiritual connection) or interpersonal (love between humans). In the emotional state of romantic love, neurochemicals such as dopamine, norepinephrine, serotonin, and oxytocin stimulate the brain's reward system through the mesocorticolimbic pathway (MCL). This dopaminergic pathway may result in side effects such as tachycardia (increased heart rate), loss of appetite, insomnia (sleeplessness), and intense euphoria.

== Culture ==
Human society statistics
- Most widely spoken languages: English, Mandarin Chinese, Hindi, Spanish, French, Standard Arabic, Bengali, Russian, Portuguese, Urdu
- Most practiced religions: Christianity, Islam, Hinduism, Buddhism, folk religions, Sikhism, Judaism, unaffiliated

Humanity's large set of intellectual skills was a key factor in the species' eventual technological advancement and concomitant domination of the biosphere. Disregarding extinct hominids, humans are the only animals known to teach generalizable information, innately deploy recursive embedding to generate and communicate complex concepts, engage in the "folk physics" required for competent tool design, or cook food in the wild. The ability to preserve and teach information to future generations in one or more societies is known as the ratchet effect in anthropology. According to the metaphor, once a group of people understands a technology, it is hard for them to unlearn it, and it may be used to learn technologies of further complexity. Teaching and learning preserves the cultural and ethnographic identity of human societies. Other traits and behaviors that are mostly unique to humans include starting fires, phoneme structuring and vocal learning.

=== Language ===
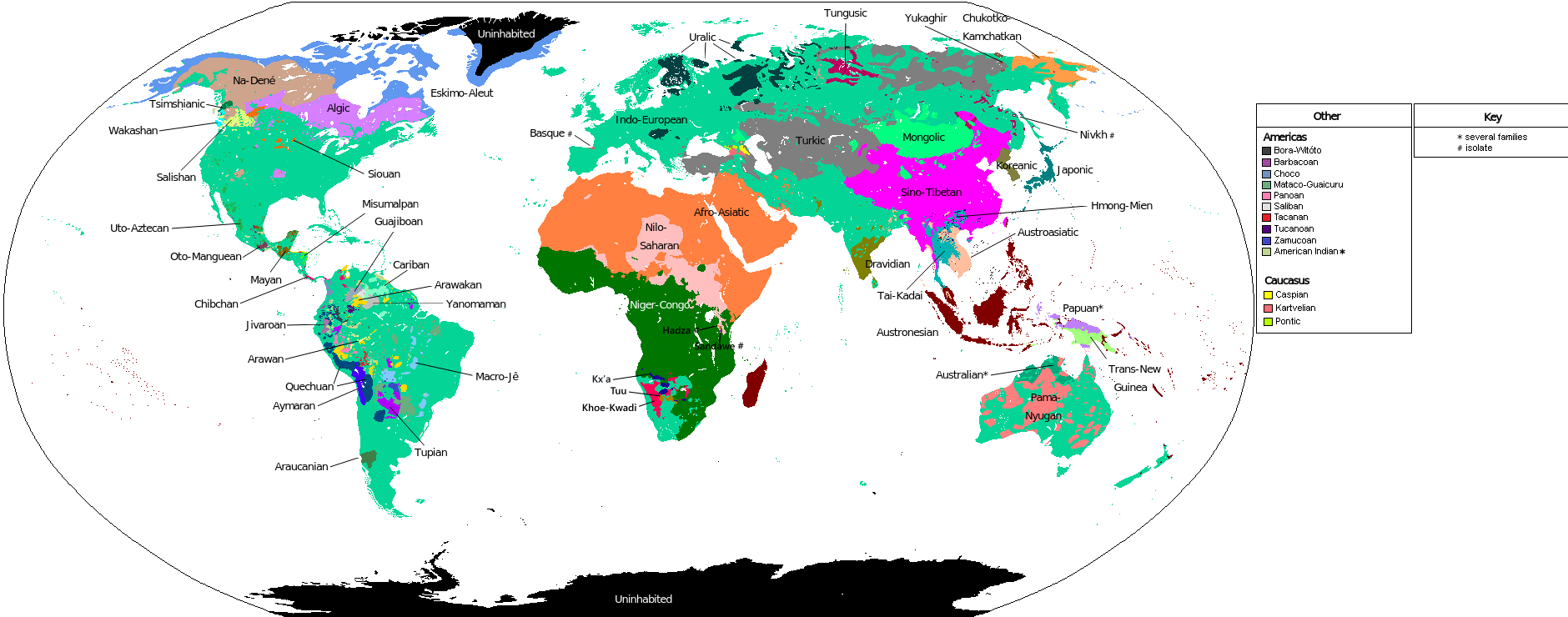
Principal language families of the world (and in some cases geographic groups of families)

While many species communicate, language is unique to humans, a defining feature of humanity, and a cultural universal. Unlike the limited communication systems of other animals, human language is open – an infinite number of meanings can be produced by combining a limited number of symbols. Human language also has the capacity of displacement, using words to represent things and happenings that are not presently or locally occurring but reside in the shared imagination of interlocutors.

Language differs from other forms of communication in that it is modality independent; people can convey the same meanings through different media: audibly in speech, visually by sign language or writing, and through tactile media such as braille. Language is central to communication between humans, and to the sense of identity that can unite nations, cultures, and ethnic groups.

As of 1996, humans used approximately six thousand different languages, including sign languages, and many thousands more are extinct.

=== The arts ===
Human arts can take many forms, including visual, literary, and performing. Visual art can range from paintings and sculptures to film, fashion design, and architecture. Literary arts can include prose, poetry, and dramas. The performing arts generally involve theater, music, and dance. Humans often combine the different forms (for example, music videos). Other entities that have been described as having artistic qualities include food preparation, video games, and medicine. As well as providing entertainment and transferring knowledge, the arts are also used for political purposes.

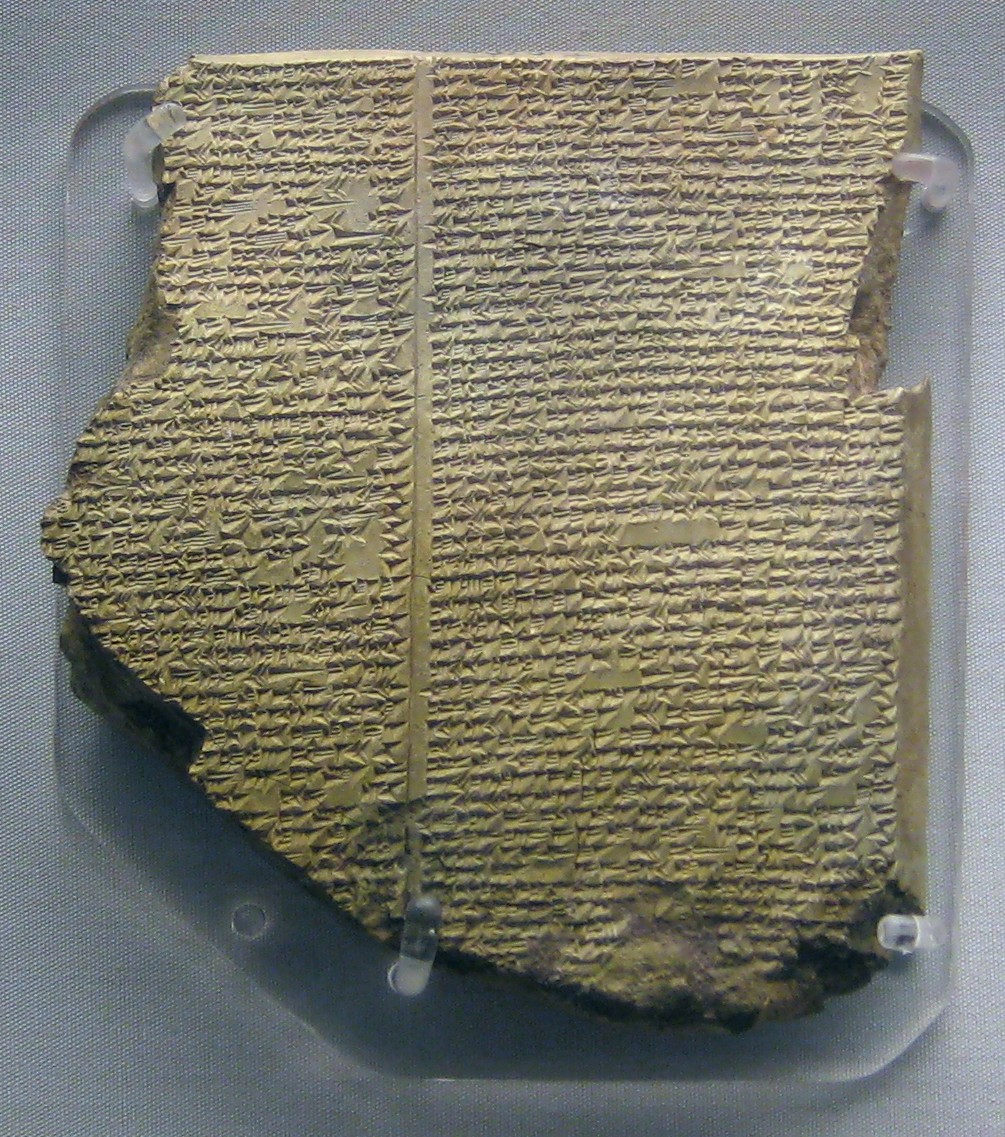
The Deluge tablet of the Gilgamesh epic in Akkadian

Art is a defining characteristic of humans, and there is evidence for a relationship between creativity and language. The earliest evidence of art was shell engravings made by Homo erectus 300,000 years before modern humans evolved. Art attributed to H. sapiens existed at least 75,000 years ago, with jewelry and drawings found in caves in South Africa. There are various hypotheses as to why humans have adapted to the arts. These include allowing them to better problem-solve issues, providing a means to control or influence other humans, encouraging cooperation and contribution within a society, or increasing the chance of attracting a potential mate. The use of imagination developed through art, combined with logic, may have given early humans an evolutionary advantage.

Evidence of humans engaging in musical activities predates cave art, and so far music has been practiced by virtually all known human cultures. There exists a wide variety of music genres and ethnic musics, with humans' musical abilities being related to other abilities, including complex social human behaviors. It has been shown that human brains respond to music by becoming synchronized with the rhythm and beat, a process called entrainment. Dance is also a form of human expression found in all cultures and may have evolved as a way to help early humans communicate. Listening to music and observing dance stimulates the orbitofrontal cortex and other pleasure-sensing areas of the brain.

Unlike speaking, reading and writing do not come naturally to humans and must be taught. Still, literature has been present before the invention of words and language, with 30,000-year-old paintings on walls inside some caves portraying a series of dramatic scenes. One of the oldest surviving works of literature is the Epic of Gilgamesh, first engraved on ancient Babylonian tablets about 4,000 years ago. Beyond simply passing down knowledge, the use and sharing of imaginative fiction through stories might have helped develop humans' capabilities for communication and increased the likelihood of securing a mate. Storytelling may also be used as a way to provide the audience with moral lessons and encourage cooperation.

=== Tools and technologies ===
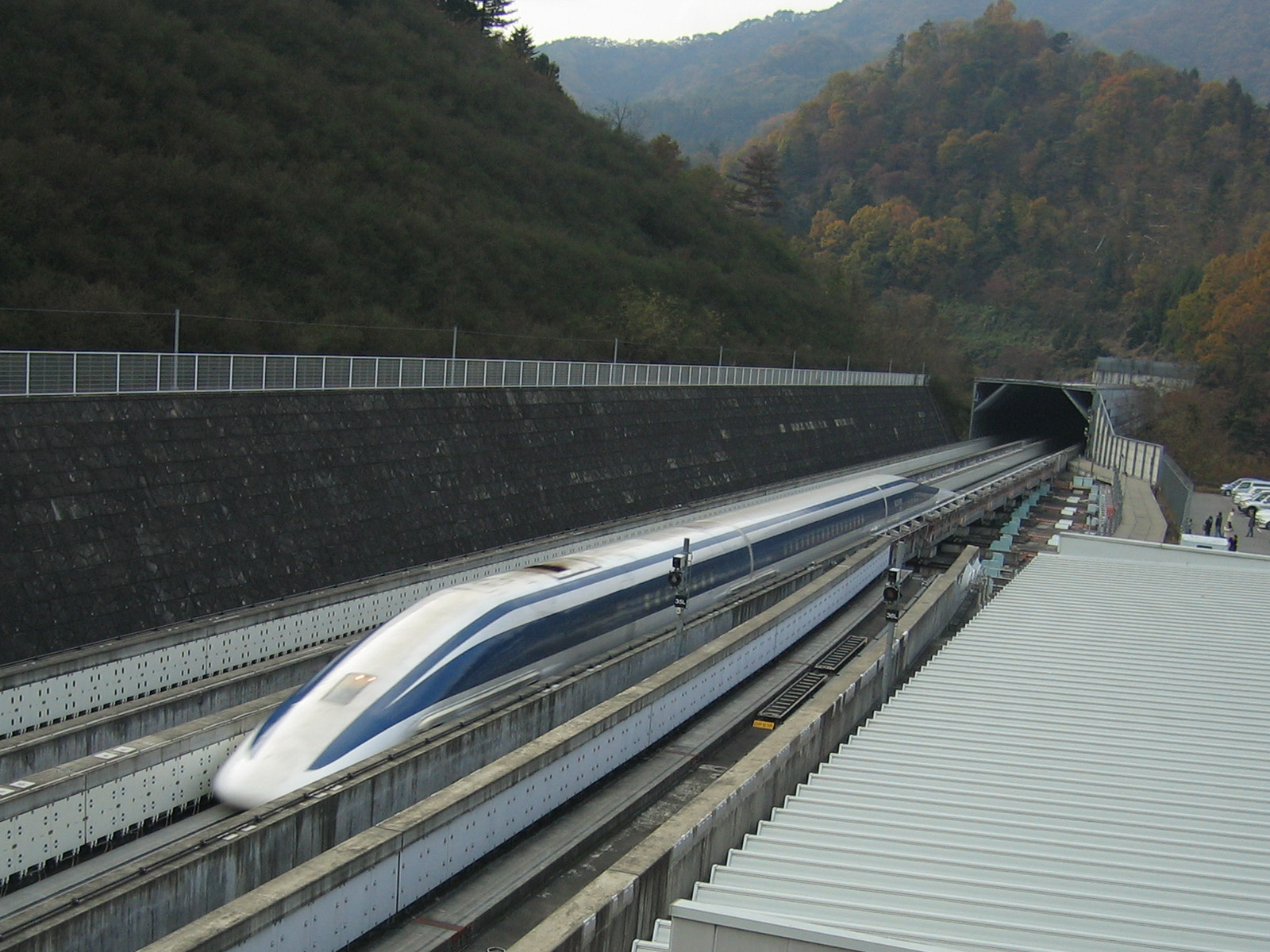
The SCMaglev, the fastest train in the world, at 603 km/h (375 mph) as of 2015

Stone tools were used by proto-humans at least 2.5 million years ago. The use and manufacture of tools has been put forward as the ability that defines humans more than anything else and has historically been seen as an important evolutionary step. The technology became much more sophisticated about 1.8 million years ago, with the controlled use of fire beginning around 1 million years ago. The wheel and wheeled vehicles appeared simultaneously in several regions sometime in the fourth millennium BC. The development of more complex tools and technologies allowed land to be cultivated and animals to be domesticated, thus proving essential in the development of agriculture – what is known as the Neolithic Revolution.

China developed paper, the printing press, gunpowder, the compass and other important inventions. The continued improvements in smelting allowed the forging of copper, bronze, iron, and eventually steel—which is used in railways, skyscrapers, and many other products. This coincided with the Industrial Revolution, where the invention of automated machines brought major changes to humans' lifestyles. Modern technology is observed as progressing exponentially, with major innovations in the 20th century including: electricity, penicillin, semiconductors, internal combustion engines, the Internet, nitrogen-fixing fertilizers, airplanes, computers, automobiles, contraceptive pills, nuclear fission, the green revolution, radio, scientific plant breeding, rockets, air conditioning, television and the assembly line.

=== Religion and spirituality ===
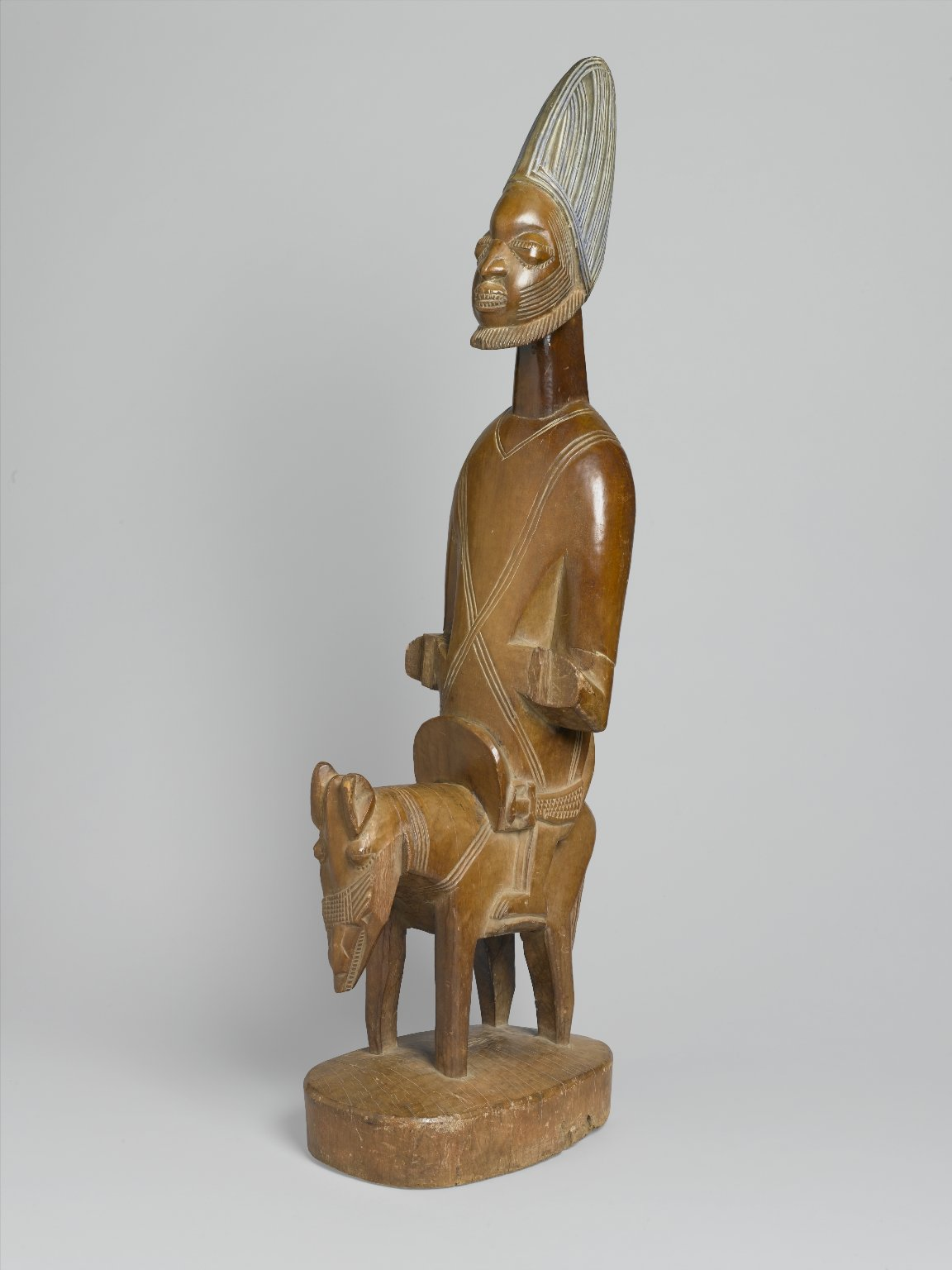
Shango, the Orisha of fire, lightning, and thunder, in the Yoruba religion, depicted on horseback

Definitions of religion vary; according to one definition, a religion is a belief system concerning the supernatural, sacred or divine, and practices, values, institutions and rituals associated with such belief. Some religions also have a moral code. The evolution and the history of the first religions have become areas of active scientific investigation. Credible evidence of religious behavior dates to the Middle Paleolithic era (45–200 thousand years ago). It may have evolved to play a role in helping enforce and encourage cooperation between humans.

Religion manifests in diverse forms. Religion can include a belief in life after death, the origin of life, the nature of the universe (religious cosmology) and its ultimate fate (eschatology), and moral or ethical teachings. Views on transcendence and immanence vary substantially; traditions variously espouse monism, deism, pantheism, and theism (including polytheism and monotheism).

Although measuring religiosity is difficult, a majority of humans profess some variety of religious or spiritual belief. In 2020, the plurality was Christian, followed by Muslim, Hindu, and Buddhist. As of 2020, about 24%, or 1.9 billion humans, were irreligious, including those with no religious beliefs or no identity with any religion.

=== Science and philosophy ===
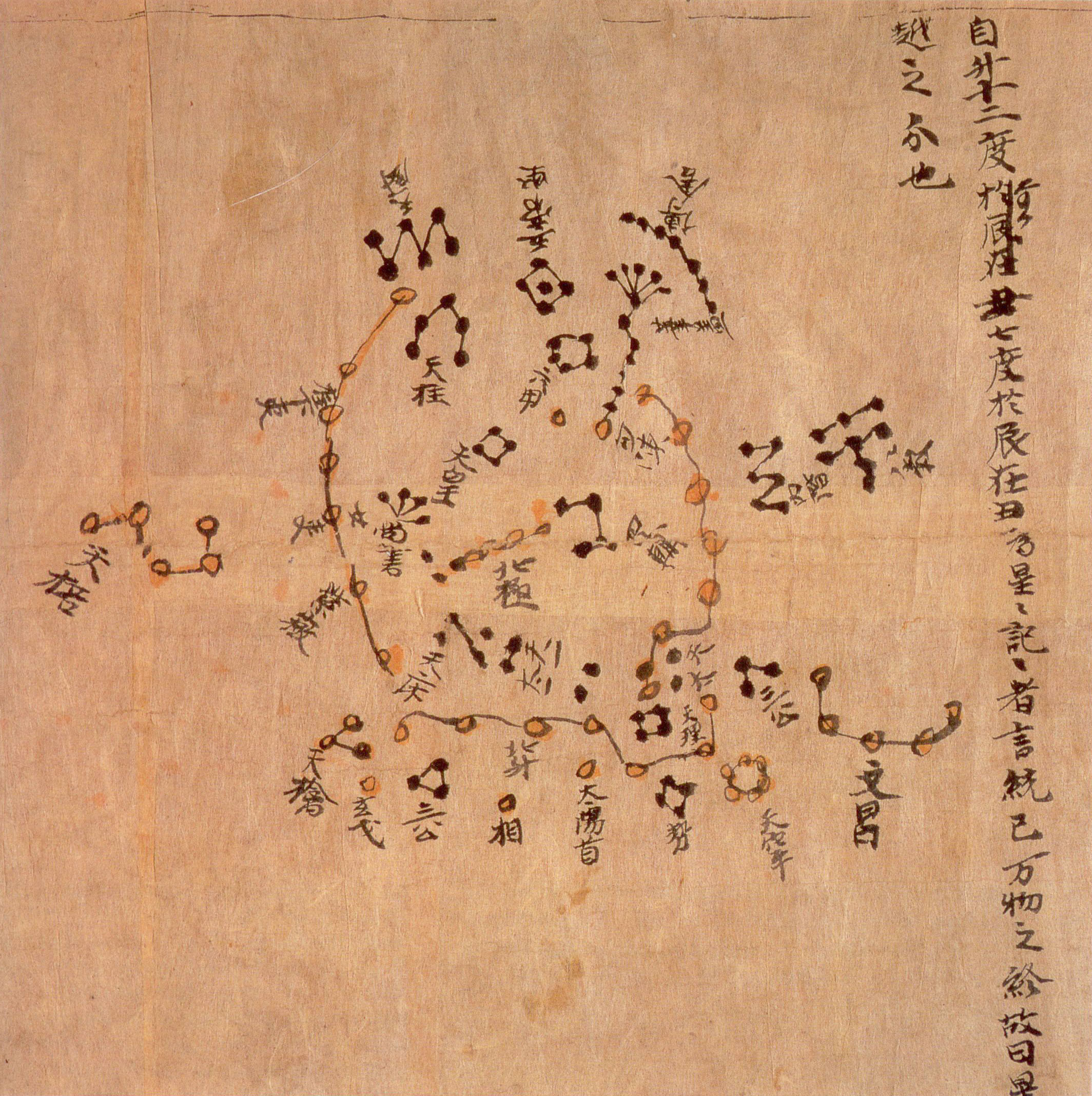
The Dunhuang map, a star map showing the North Polar region, made in China c. 700

A defining attribute of humanity is the capacity for cumulative cultural evolution by transmitting knowledge across generations by continuously building on past knowledge to develop tools, scientific laws, and other advancements to pass on to future generations, known as the ratchet effect in anthropology. This accumulated knowledge can be tested to answer various questions or make predictions about how the universe functions, driving ongoing human advancement.

Aristotle has been described as the first scientist, and preceded the rise of scientific thought through the Hellenistic period. Other early advances in science came from the Han dynasty in China and during the Islamic Golden Age. The Scientific Revolution, near the end of the Renaissance, led to the emergence of modern science.

A chain of events and influences led to the development of the scientific method, a process of observation and experimentation that is used to differentiate science from pseudoscience. An understanding of mathematics is unique to humans, although other species of animals have some numerical cognition. All of science can be divided into three major branches, the formal sciences (e.g., logic and mathematics), which are concerned with formal systems, the applied sciences (e.g., engineering, medicine), which are focused on practical applications, and the empirical sciences, which are based on empirical observation and are in turn divided into natural sciences (e.g., physics, chemistry, biology) and social sciences (e.g., psychology, economics, sociology).

Philosophy is a field of study where humans seek to understand fundamental truths about themselves and the world in which they live. Philosophical inquiry has been a major feature in the development of humans' intellectual history. It has been described as the "no man's land" between definitive scientific knowledge and dogmatic religious teachings. Major fields of philosophy include metaphysics, epistemology, logic, and axiology (which includes ethics and aesthetics).

== Society ==
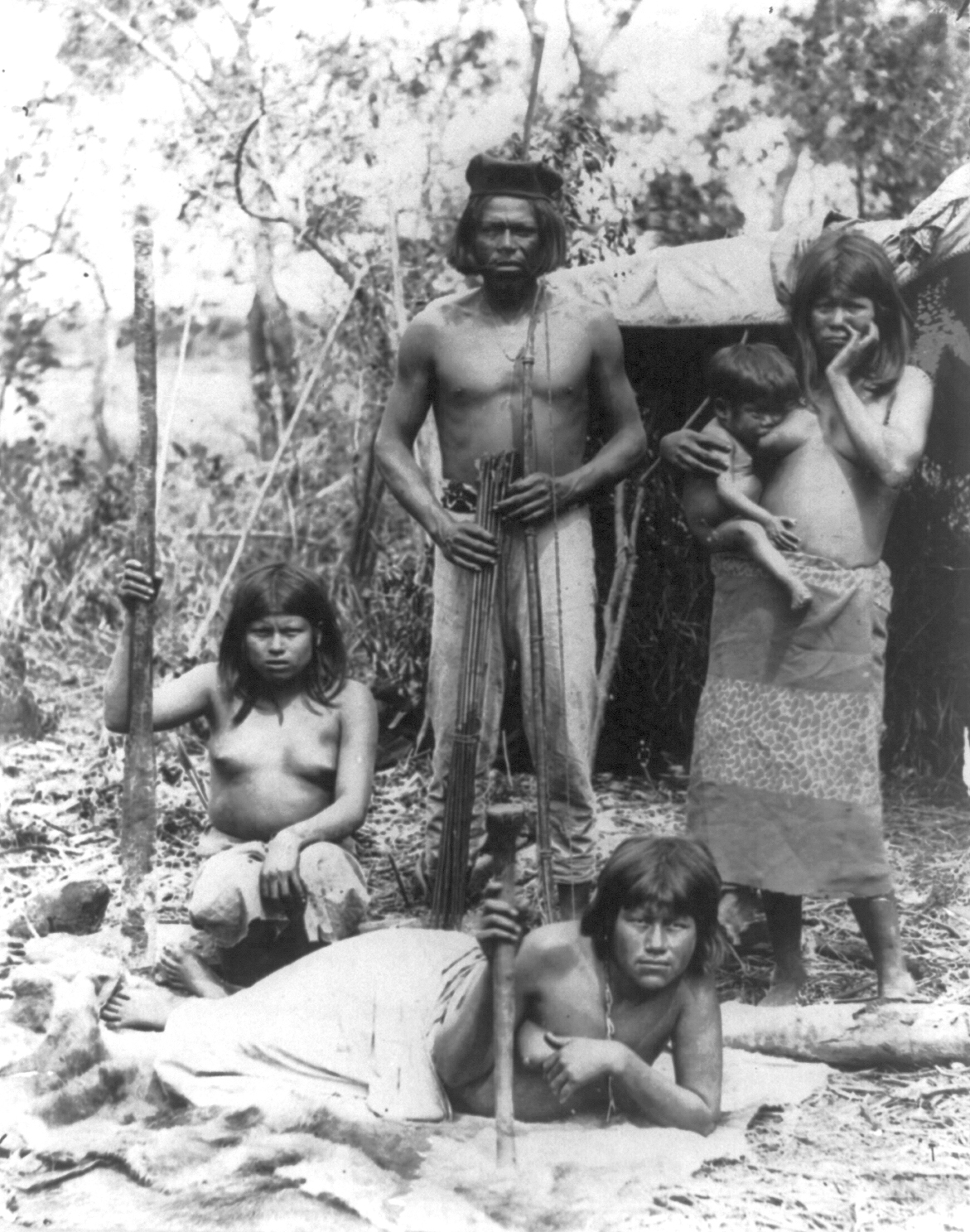
Photo taken between 1890 and 1923 of an indigenous family in Brazil, consisting of three adolescent or adult females, an adult male, and a baby. Humans often live in family-based social structures.

Society is the system of organizations and institutions arising from interaction between humans. Humans are highly social and tend to live in large complex social groups. They can be divided into different groups according to their income, wealth, power, reputation, and other factors. The structure of social stratification and the degree of social mobility differ, especially between modern and traditional societies. Human groups range from the size of families to nations. The first form of human social organization is thought to have resembled hunter-gatherer band societies.

=== Gender ===
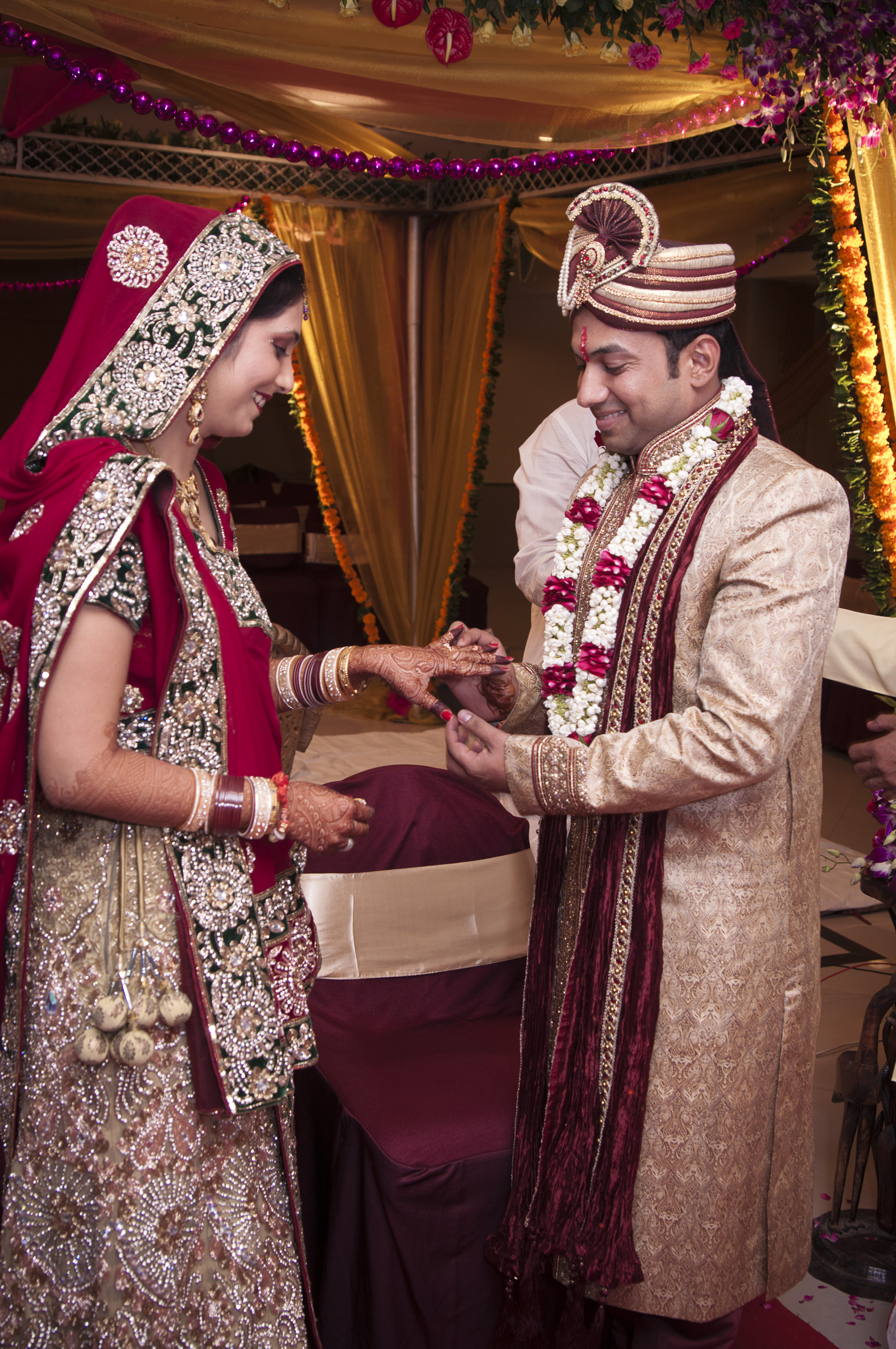
A man as the groom and a woman as the bride in a Hindu North Indian wedding, the groom wearing a sherwani and pagri turban and the bride wearing a sari

Human societies typically exhibit gender identities and gender roles that distinguish between masculine and feminine characteristics and prescribe the range of acceptable behaviors and attitudes for their members based on their sex. The most common categorization is a gender binary of men and women. Some societies recognize a third gender, or less commonly a fourth or fifth. In some other societies, non-binary is used as an umbrella term for a range of gender identities that are not solely male or female.

Gender roles are often associated with a division of norms, practices, dress, behavior, rights, duties, privileges, status, and power, with men enjoying more rights and privileges than women in most societies, both today and in the past. As a social construct, gender roles are not fixed and vary historically within a society. Challenges to predominant gender norms have recurred in many societies. Little is known about gender roles in the earliest human societies. Early modern humans probably had a range of gender roles similar to that of modern cultures from at least the Upper Paleolithic, while the Neanderthals were less sexually dimorphic and there is evidence that the behavioral difference between males and females was minimal.

=== Kinship ===
All human societies organize, recognize, and classify types of social relationships based on relations between parents, children, and other descendants (consanguinity), and relations through marriage (affinity). There is also a third type applied to godparents or adoptive children (fictive). These culturally defined relationships are referred to as kinship. In many societies, it is one of the most important social organizing principles and plays a role in transmitting status and inheritance. All societies have rules of incest taboo, according to which marriage between certain kinds of kin relations is prohibited, and some also have rules of preferential marriage with certain kin relations.

Pair bonding is a ubiquitous feature of human sexual relationships, whether it is manifested as serial monogamy, polygyny, or polyandry. Genetic evidence indicates that humans were predominantly polygynous for most of their existence as a species, but that this began to shift during the Neolithic, when monogamy started becoming widespread concomitantly with the transition from nomadic to sedentary societies. Anatomical evidence in the form of second-to-fourth digit ratios, a biomarker for prenatal androgen effects, likewise indicates modern humans were polygynous during the Pleistocene.

=== Ethnicity ===
Human ethnic groups are a social category that identifies people together based on shared attributes that distinguish them from other groups. These can be a common set of traditions, ancestry, language, history, society, culture, nation, religion, or social treatment within their residing area. Ethnicity is separate from the concept of race, which is based on physical characteristics, although both are socially constructed. Assigning ethnicity to a certain population is complicated, as even within common ethnic designations there can be a diverse range of subgroups, and the makeup of these ethnic groups can change over time at both the collective and individual level. Also, there is no generally accepted definition of what constitutes an ethnic group. Ethnic groupings can play a powerful role in the social identity and solidarity of ethnopolitical units. This has been closely tied to the rise of the nation state as the predominant form of political organization in the 19th and 20th centuries.

=== Government and politics ===
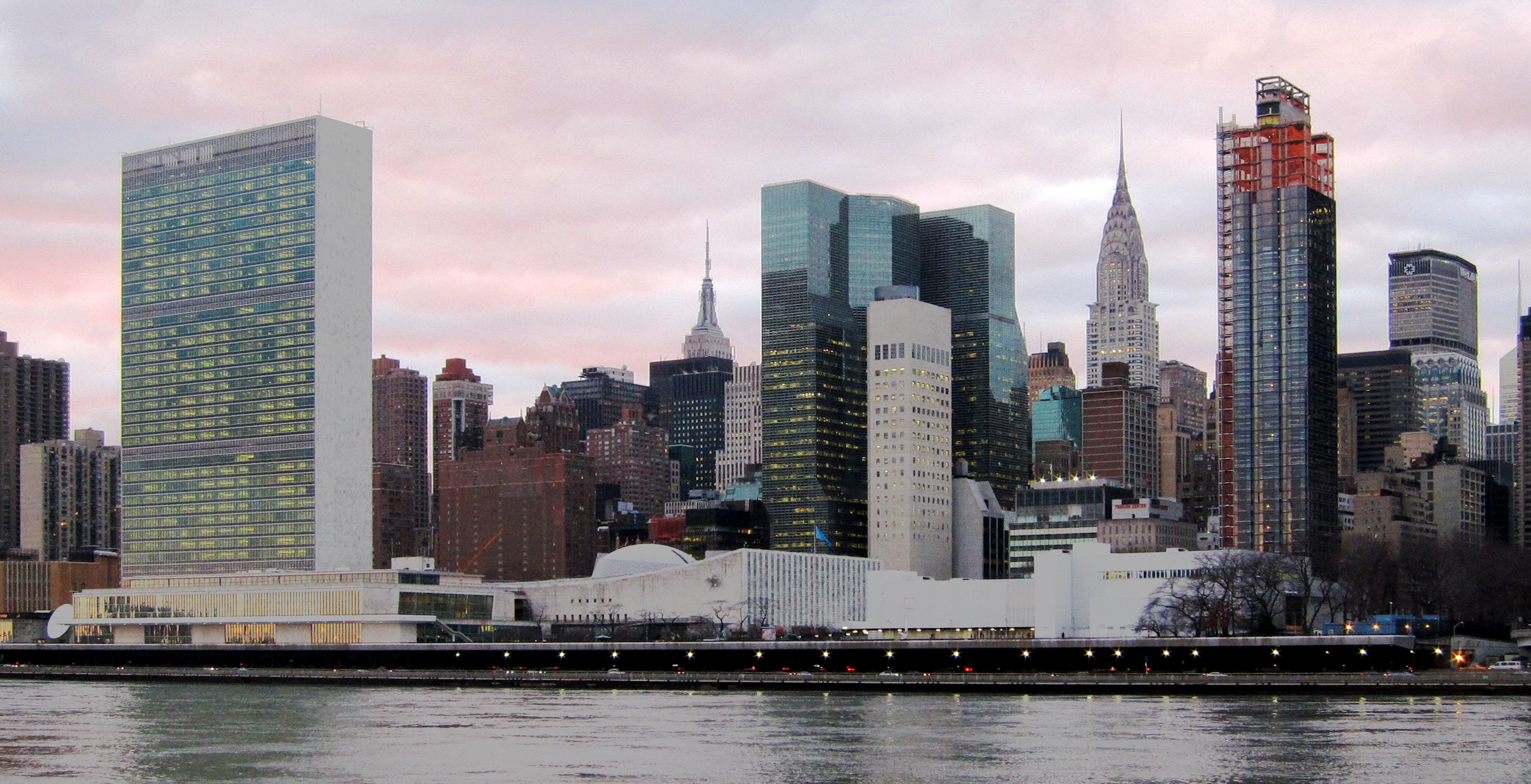
The United Nations headquarters (left) in New York City houses one of the world's largest political organizations.

As farming populations gathered in larger and denser communities, interactions between these different groups increased. This led to the development of governance within and between the communities. Humans have evolved the ability to change affiliation with various social groups relatively easily, including previously strong political alliances, if doing so is seen as providing personal advantages. This cognitive flexibility allows individual humans to change their political ideologies, with those with higher flexibility less likely to support authoritarian and nationalistic stances.

Governments create laws and policies that affect the citizens they govern. There have been many forms of government throughout human history, each having various means of obtaining power and the ability to exert diverse controls on the population. As of 2021, approximately 47% of humans lived in some form of a democracy, 17% in a hybrid regime, and 37% in an authoritarian regime. Many countries belong to international organizations and alliances; the largest of these is the United Nations, with 193 member states.

=== Trade and economics ===
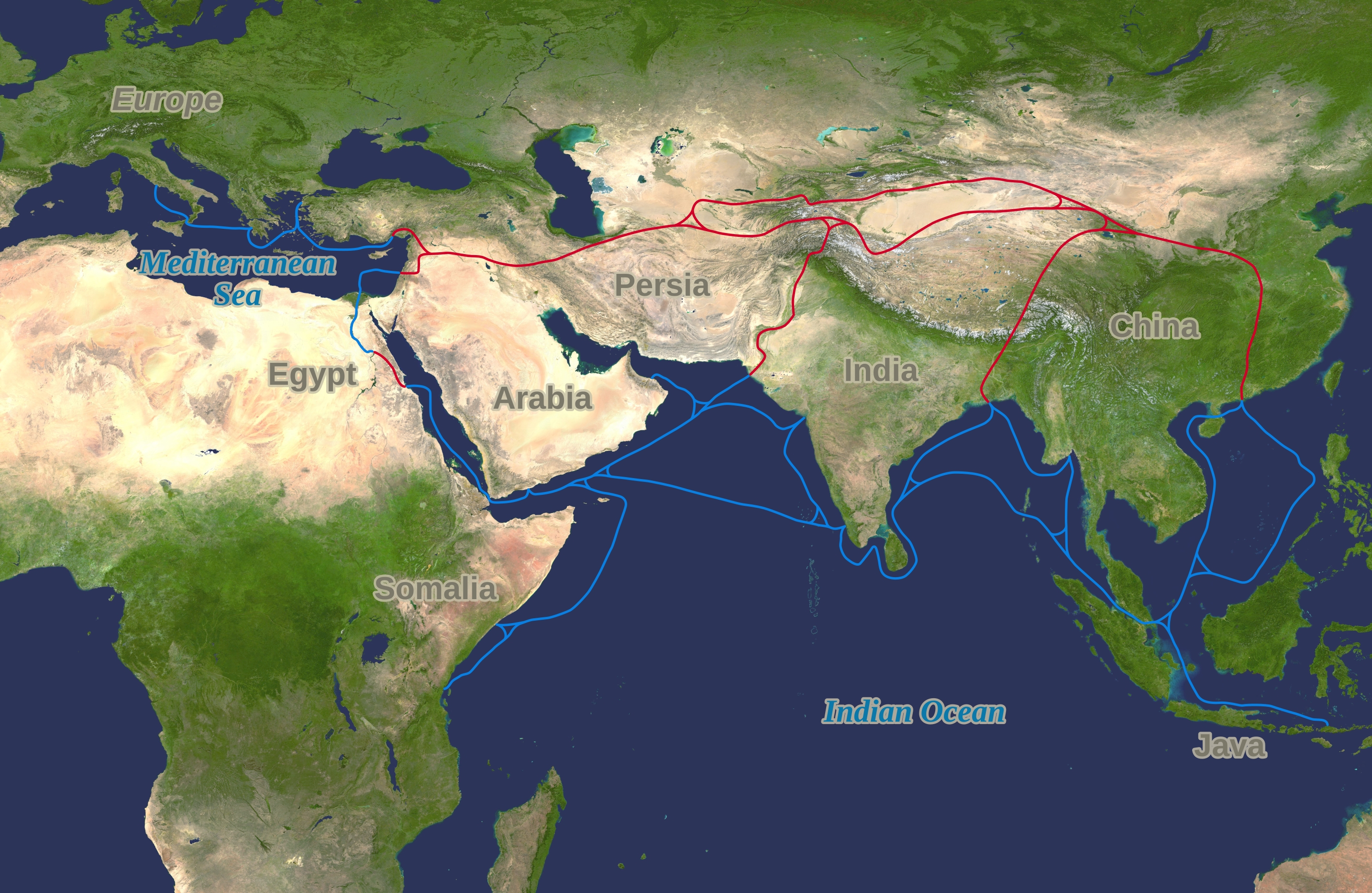
The Silk Road (red) and spice trade routes (blue)

Trade, the voluntary exchange of goods and services, is seen as a characteristic that differentiates humans from other animals and has been cited as a practice that gave Homo sapiens a major advantage over other hominids. Evidence suggests early H. sapiens made use of long-distance trade routes to exchange goods and ideas, leading to cultural explosions and providing additional food sources when hunting was sparse, while such trade networks did not exist for the now extinct Neanderthals. Early trade likely involved materials for creating tools like obsidian. The first truly international trade routes were around the spice trade through the Roman and medieval periods.

Early human economies were more likely to be based around gift-giving instead of a bartering system. Early money consisted of commodities; the oldest being in the form of cattle and the most widely used being cowrie shells. Money has since evolved into government-issued coins, paper, and electronic money. Economics is a social science that studies how societies distribute scarce resources among different people. There are massive inequalities in the division of wealth among humans; the eight richest humans are worth the same monetary value as the poorest half of all the human population.

=== Conflict ===
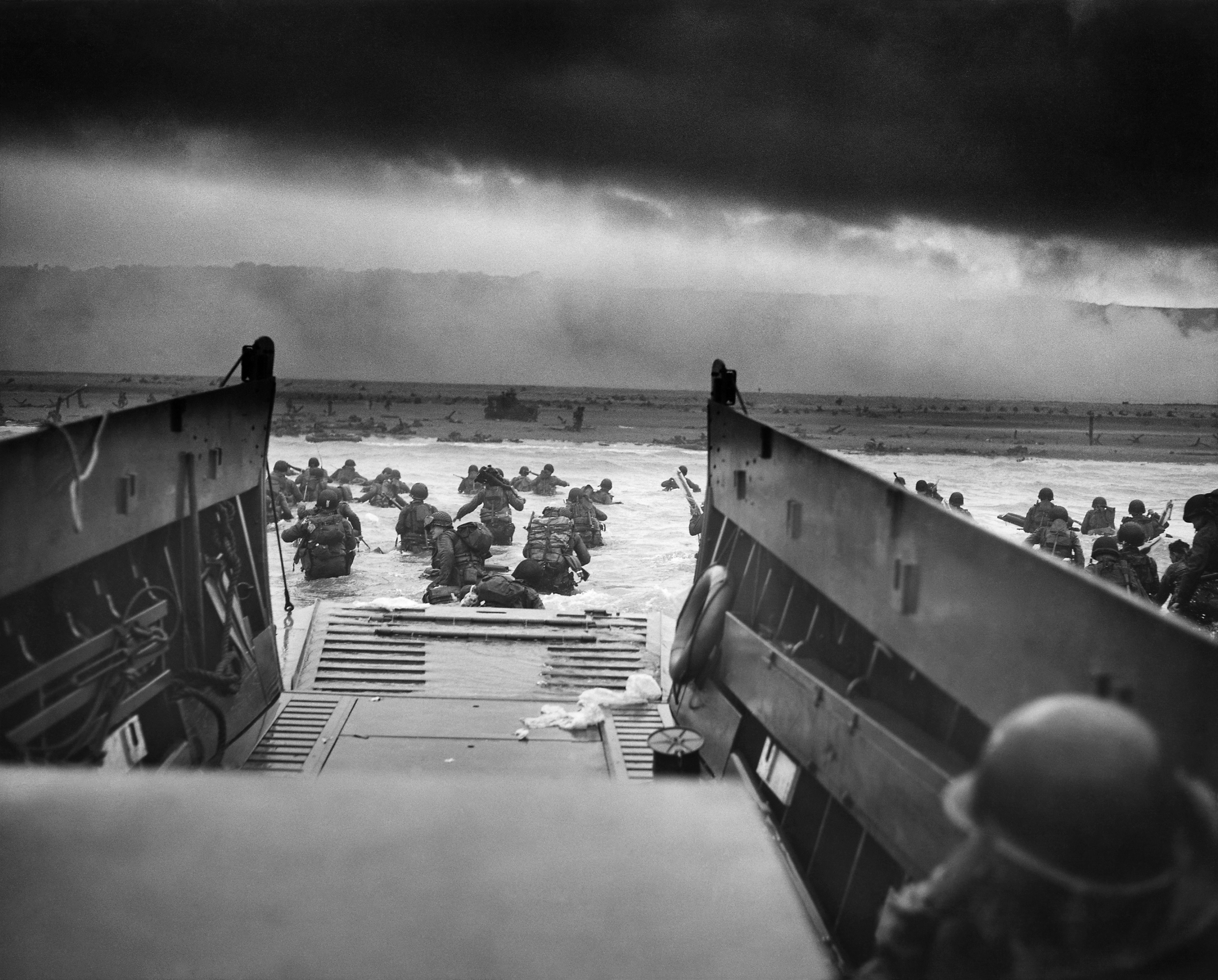
American troops landing at Normandy during World War II

Humans commit violence on other humans at a rate comparable to other primates, but have an increased preference for killing adults, infanticide being more common among other primates. Phylogenetic analysis predicts that 2% of early H. sapiens were murdered, rising to 12% during the medieval period, before dropping to below 2% in modern times. There is great variation in violence between human populations, with rates of homicide about 0.01% in societies that have legal systems and strong cultural attitudes against violence. Other factors influencing homicide rates are relative resource discrepancies and the cost-benefit analysis of murder versus other problem-solving strategies.

The willingness of humans to kill other members of their species en masse through organized conflict (i.e., war) has long been the subject of debate. One school of thought holds that war evolved as a means to eliminate competitors, and has always been an innate human characteristic. Another suggests that war is a relatively recent phenomenon and has appeared due to changing social conditions. While not settled, current evidence indicates that interpersonal violence has been a ubiquitous part of human history since the beginnings of the species' existence, with the bioarchaeological record showing significant incidence of violent trauma believed to be a result of war in hunter-gatherer populations long before the emergence of agriculture and settled societies.

War has had a high cost on human life; it is estimated that during the 20th century, between 167 million and 188 million people died as a result of war. War casualty data is less reliable for pre-medieval times, especially global figures. But compared with any period over the past 600 years, the past 80 years (post-1945) have seen a very significant drop in global military and civilian death rates due to armed conflict.

== See also ==
- List of human evolution fossils
- Timeline of human evolution
