= Human Universals =

Book by Donald Brown

- Cover of the first edition
- Author: Donald Brown
- Language: English
- Subject: Cultural anthropology
- Publisher: McGraw Hill
- Publication date: 1991
- Publication place: United States
- Media type: Print (Hardcover and Paperback)
- Pages: 220
- ISBN: 0-87722-841-8
- OCLC: 22860694

Human Universals is a book by Donald Brown, an American professor of anthropology (emeritus) who worked at the University of California, Santa Barbara. It was published by McGraw Hill in 1991. Brown says human universals, "comprise those features of culture, society, language, behavior, and psyche for which there are no known exception."

According to Brown, there are many universals common to all human societies. On the book's second edition, Brown expressed regret at not specifically criticizing Michel Foucalt's denial of the existence of universals, thereby making his research argument and evidence more easily found.

Steven Pinker lists all Brown's universals in the appendix of his book The Blank Slate. The list includes several hundred universals, and notes Brown's later article on human universals in The MIT Encyclopedia of the Cognitive Sciences.

The list is seen by Brown (and Pinker) to be evidence of mental adaptations to communal life in our species' evolutionary history.^{p53} The issues raised by Brown's list are essentially darwinian. They occur in Darwin's Descent of Man (1871) and The Expression of the Emotions in Man and Animals (1872), and in Huxley's Evidence as to Man's Place in Nature (1863). The list gives little emphasis to the issues of aggression, physical conflict and warfare, which have an extensive literature in ethology. Brown's list does have conflict and its mediation as items. He also makes note of the fact that human males are more prone to violence and aggression than females.
