= Cultural universal =

Anthropological concept, element common to all human cultures

A cultural universal (also called an anthropological universal or human universal) is an element, pattern, trait, or institution that is common to all known human cultures worldwide. Taken together, the whole body of cultural universals is known as the human condition. Evolutionary psychologists hold that behaviors or traits that occur universally in all cultures are good candidates for evolutionary adaptations. Some anthropological and sociological theorists that take a cultural relativist perspective may deny the existence of cultural universals: the extent to which these universals are "cultural" in the narrow sense, or in fact biologically inherited behavior is an issue of "nature versus nurture". Prominent scholars on the topic include Emile Durkheim, George Murdock, Claude Lévi-Strauss, and Donald Brown.

== Donald Brown's list in Human Universals ==
In his book Human Universals (1991), Donald Brown defines human universals as comprising "those features of culture, society, language, behavior, and psyche for which there are no known exception", providing a list of hundreds of items he suggests as universal. Among the cultural universals listed by Donald Brown are:

=== Language and cognition ===
- Language is translatable
- Abstraction in speech and thought
- Antonyms, synonyms
- Logical notions of "and", "not", "opposite", "equivalent", "part/whole", "general/particular"
- Binary cognitive distinctions
- Color terms: black, white
- Classification of: age, behavioral propensities, body parts, colors, fauna, flora, inner states, kin, gender, space, tools, weather conditions
- Continua (ordering as cognitive pattern)
- Discrepancies between speech, thought, and action
- Figurative speech, metaphors
- Symbolism, symbolic speech
- Synesthetic metaphors
- Tabooed utterances
- Special speech for special occasions
- Prestige from proficient use of language (e.g. poetry)
- Planning
- Units of time
- Language employed to manipulate, misinform, or mislead

=== Society ===
- Personal names
- Family or household
- Kin groups
- Peer groups not based on family
- Actions under self-control distinguished from those not under control
- Affection expressed and felt
- Age grades, statuses, and terms
- Law: rights and obligations, rules of membership
- Moral sentiments
- Distinguishing right and wrong, good and bad
- Promise/oath
- Prestige inequalities
- Statuses and roles
- Leaders
- Inclination towards patriarchy (dominance of men in society)
- De facto oligarchy
- Property
- Coalitions
- Collective identities
- Conflict
- Cooperative labor
- Gender roles
- Males on average travel greater distances over lifetime
- Marriage
- Husband older than wife on average
- Copulation normally conducted in privacy
- Incest prevention or avoidance, incest between mother and son unthinkable
- Collective decision making
- Etiquette
- Inheritance rules
- Generosity admired, gift giving
- Mood- or consciousness-altering techniques and/or substances
- Redress of wrongs, sanctions
- Sexual jealousy
- Sexual violence
- Shame
- Territoriality
- Triangular awareness (assessing relationships among the self and two other people)
- Some forms of proscribed violence
- Visiting
- Trade

=== Beliefs ===
- Magical thinking
- Use of magic to increase life and win love
- Beliefs about death
- Beliefs about disease
- Beliefs about fortune and misfortune
- Divination
- Attempts to control weather
- Dream interpretation
- Beliefs and narratives
- Proverbs, sayings
- Poetry/rhetorics
- Healing practices, medicine
- Childbirth customs
- Rites of passage
- Music, rhythm, dance, and to some degree associations between music and emotion
- Play
- Toys, playthings
- Death rituals, mourning, funerals
- Feasting
- Body adornment
- Hairstyles
- Art

=== Technology ===
- Shelter
- Control of fire
- Tools, tool making
- Weapons, spear
- Containers
- Cooking
- Lever
- Rope

== Nicholas Christakis' innate social universals ==
Based on experiments and studies of accidental and utopian societies, sociologist and evolutionary biologist Nicholas Christakis proposes that humans have evolved to genetically favor societies that have eight universal attributes, including:

- Love for romantic partners
- Love for offspring
- Friendship
- Social networks
- Cooperation
- In-group favoritism

== Non-nativist explanations ==
The observation of the same or similar behavior in different cultures does not prove that they are the results of a common underlying psychological mechanism. One possibility is that they may have been invented independently due to a common practical problem.

Outside influence could be an explanation for some cultural universals. This does not preclude multiple independent inventions of civilization and is therefore not the same thing as hyperdiffusionism; it merely means that cultural universals are not proof of innateness.

== See also ==
- Animal culture
- Archetype
- Biocultural anthropology
- Culture
- Social learning
- Social norm

== Bibliography ==
- Bourguignon, Erika; Greenbaum Ucko, Lenora (1973). Diversity and Homogeneity in World Societies. New Haven, Connecticut: HRAF Press. ISBN 978-0875363301.
- Brown, Donald (1991). Human Universals. Philadelphia: Temple University Press. ISBN 978-0070082090.
- Joseph H. Greenberg, et al. (1978) Universals of Human Language, 4 vols. Stanford University Press. ISBN 0804709653
- Charles D. Laughlin and Eugene G. d'Aquili (1974) Biogenetic Structuralism. New York: Columbia University Press. ISBN 9780231038171
- Claude Lévi-Strauss (1966) The Savage Mind. Chicago: The University of Chicago Press; London: Weidenfeld and Nicolson Ltd. ISBN 0226474844. [First published in French in 1962 as La Pensee Sauvage. ISBN 2259002110.]
- George P. Murdock (1945), "The Common Denominator of Culture", in The Science of Man in the World Crisis, Ralph Linton (ed.). New York: Columbia University Press. ISBN 4871872386
- Charles E. Osgood, William S May, and Murray S Miron (1975) Cross-Cultural Universals of Affective Meaning Champaign, IL: University of Illinois Press. ISBN 978-0252004261
- Steven Pinker (2002), The Blank Slate: The Modern Denial of Human Nature, New York: Penguin Putnam. ISBN 9780142003343
- Rik Pinxten (1976). "Epistemic universals: A contribution to cognitive anthropology" (PART II: Chapter 7). In Pinxten, Rik (ed.). Universalism Versus Relativism in Language and Thought. The Hague: De Gruyter Mouton. ISBN 9783110805826
- Brief news report of Psychological Bulletin article, Anderson, Hildreth, Howland (2015): Berkeley Haas School of Business. (May 6, 2015) "We all want high social status". ScienceDaily. Berkeley: University of California. Retrieved 24 March 2021
