= Body ornamentation =

Practices of body ornamentation are a cultural universal (found in all human societies). They can involve

- body modification (permanent)
  - tattoos
  - branding
  - body piercing
- body art (non-permanent)
  - body painting, makeup
  - hairstyles
  - hair coloring
- accessories
  - jewelry
  - clothing

== See also ==
- Human physical appearance
