= Donald Brown (anthropologist) =

American professor of anthropology

Donald E. Brown
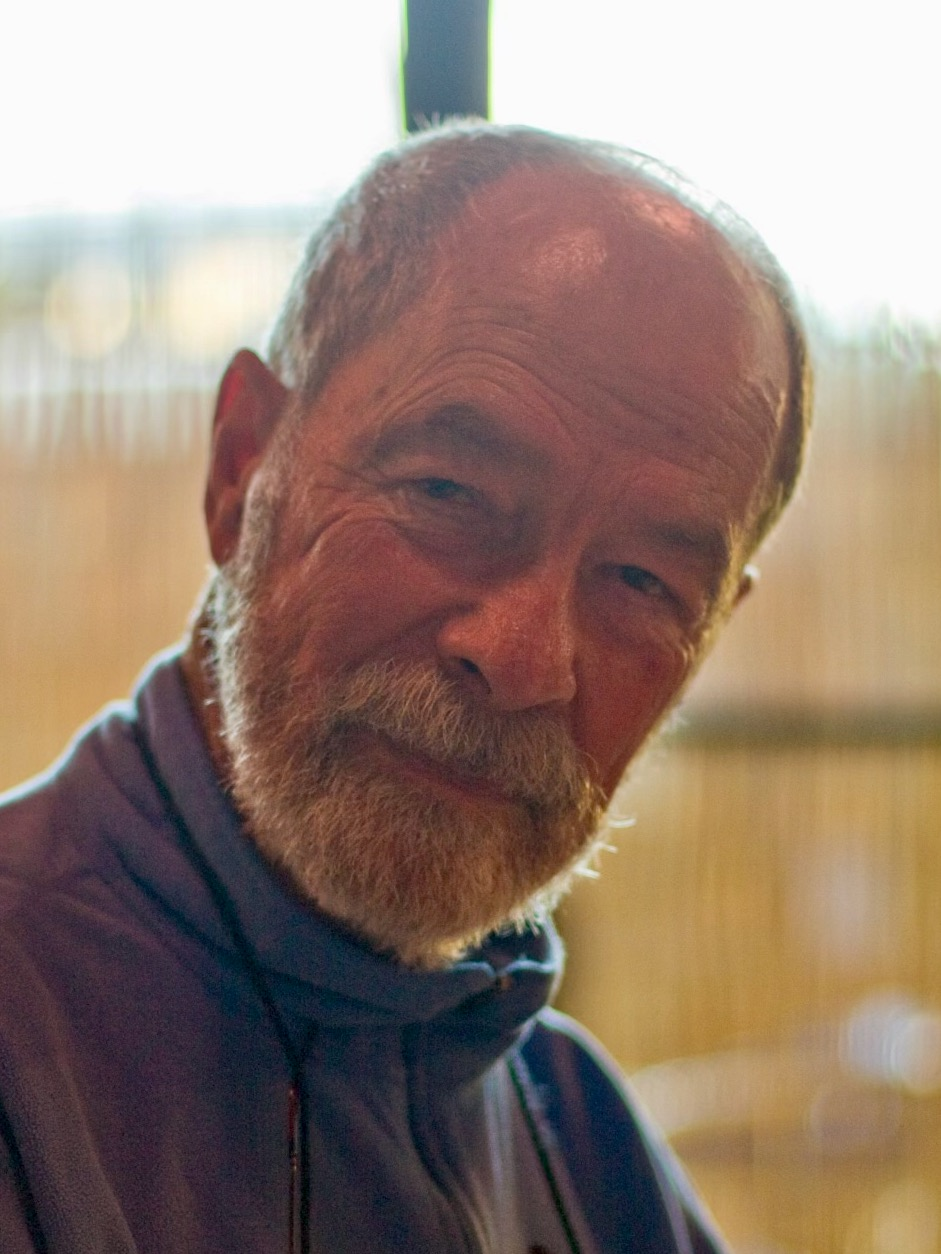
- Born: August 12, 1934 (age 92)
- Known for: Human Universals
- Scientific career
- Fields: Anthropology
- Workplaces: University of California

Donald Edward Brown (August 12, 1934–2024) was an American anthropologist.

== Work ==
He worked at the University of California, Santa Barbara. He is best known for his theoretical work regarding the existence, characteristics and relevance of universals of human nature. In his best-known work, Human Universals (1991), he says these universals, "comprise those features of culture, society, language, behavior, and psyche for which there are no known exceptions." He is quoted at length by Steven Pinker in an appendix to The Blank Slate (2002), where Pinker cites some of the hundreds of universals listed by Brown. In area studies his doctoral research on the structure and history of Brunei was foundational.

== Publications ==
Books

- Brunei: The Structure and History of Bornean Malay Sultanate (Brunei Museum, 1970)
- Hierarchy, History, and Human Nature: The Social Origins of Historical Consciousness. University of Arizona Press, 1988.
- Human Universals. New York: McGraw-Hill, 1991.

Articles

- 'Human Nature and History'. History and Theory 38 (1999): 138–157.
- 'Human Universals and their Implications'. In N. Roughley (ed.), Being humans: Anthropological Universality and Particularity in Transdisplinary Perspectives. New York: Walter de Gruyter, 2000.
- 'Human Universals, Human Nature & Human Culture'. Daedalus 133 (2004): 4, 47.

Encyclopedia entries

- 'Human Universals'. In Robert A. Wilson and Frank C. Keil (eds). The MIT Encyclopedia of the Cognitive Sciences. Cambridge, Massachusetts: MIT Press, 1999.
- 'Human Universals'. Encyclopedia of Cultural Anthropology. New York: Henry Holt. Vol. 2, pp. 607–12.
- 'Human Universals'. Theory in Social and Cultural Anthropology: An Encyclopedia. Eds. Jon McGee and Richard L. Warms. Thousand Oaks, CA: Sage Publications. pp. 410–13.

=== Reviews ===
- Christopher Boehm. 'Human Universals: Donald E. Brown'. American Anthropologist 94 (1992): 742–43.
- Walter J. Lonner. 'Human Universals: Donald E. Brown'. American Ethnologist 21 (1994): 920–21.
