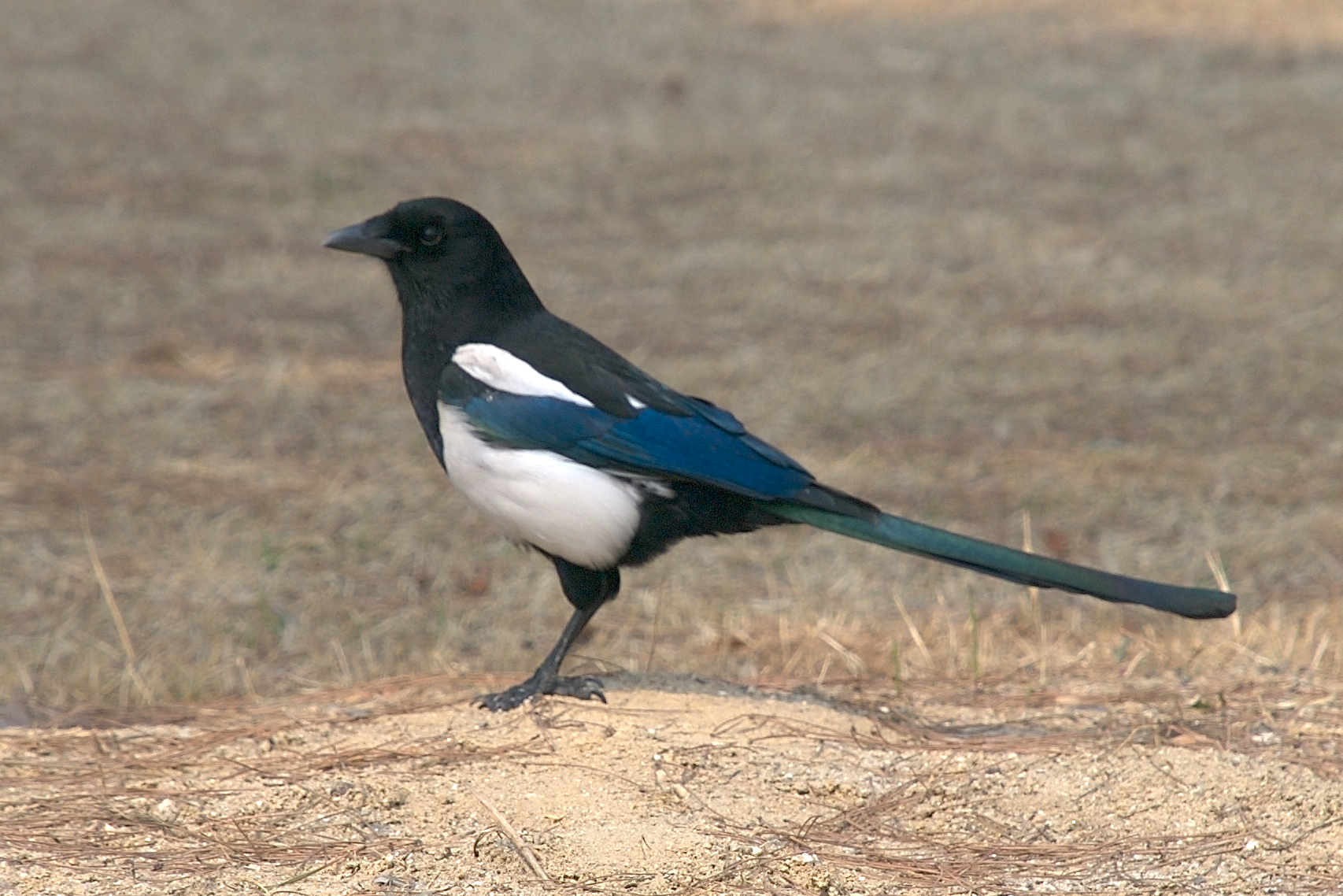
- Adult in Daejeon (South Korea)

Scientific classification
- Kingdom: Animalia
- Phylum: Chordata
- Class: Aves
- Order: Passeriformes
- Family: Corvidae
- Genus: Pica
- Species: P. serica

Binomial name
- Pica serica Gould, 1845
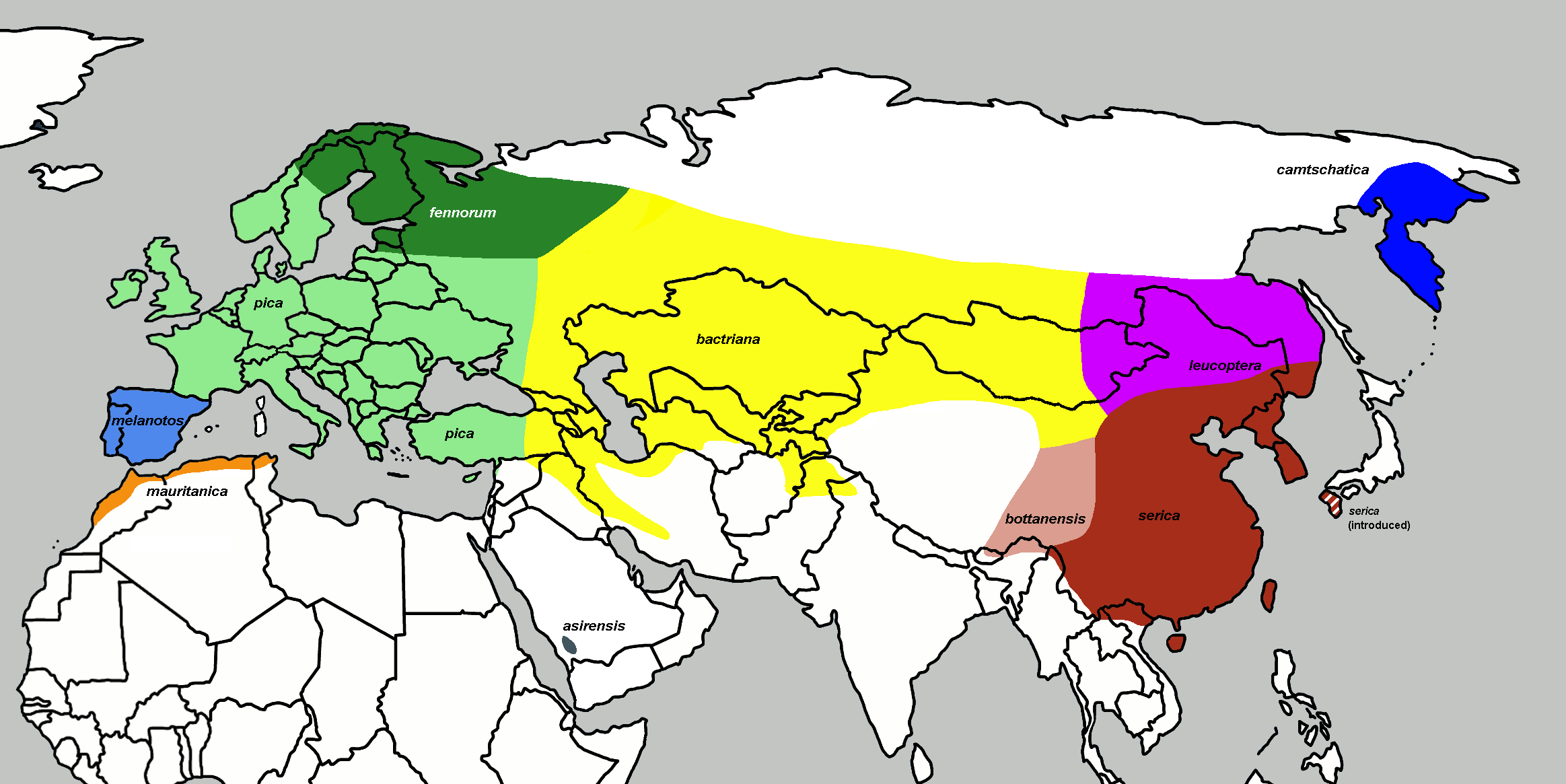
- Global range of the Oriental magpie (in Dark red) and other Afro-Eurasian Pica species.

Synonyms
- Pica pica serica (see text); Pica pica jankowskii Pica pica japonica

= Oriental magpie =

Species of bird

The Oriental magpie (Pica serica) is a species of magpie found from southeastern Russia to eastern China, Korea, Taiwan, and northern Indochina and Myanmar. It is also naturalised in Japan. Other names include Korean magpie, Chinese magpie and Asian magpie. The scientific name serica means "silky [texture]" or "Chinese"; this is the original spelling, though sometimes erroneously "corrected" to sericea.

== Taxonomy and systematics ==
Like the other magpies, the Oriental magpie is a member of the large radiation of mainly Holarctic corvids, which also includes the typical crows and ravens (Corvus), the nutcrackers (Nucifraga), and the Old World jays. The long tail might be plesiomorphic for this group, as it is also found in the tropical Asian magpies (Cissa and Urocissa) as well as in most of the very basal corvids, such as the treepies. The unique black-and-white pattern of the "monochrome" magpies is an autapomorphy.

The Oriental magpie was first described as a species, based on specimens collected in Amoy (now Xiamen) in southeastern China in 1844. Due to its similarity to the Eurasian magpie in plumage, it was reduced to a synonym of it by Richard Bowdler Sharpe in 1877, and then later more generally as a subspecies of it.

A 2018 study of DNA sequences of all the taxa in the genus Pica led to the split-up of the genus into multiple species, including the Oriental magpie, separated from the Eurasian magpie. The study placed the Oriental magpie as sister to the Asir magpie — black-rumped magpie duo, with these three then sister to the group comprising Eurasian magpie and the two North American magpie species (black-billed and yellow-billed magpies), and finally with the Maghreb magpie as basal in the whole genus.

It has two subspecies:

- Pica serica serica Gould, 1845 — the south of the species range, from northern Myanmar east to eastern China and Taiwan, and south to northern Indochina.
- Pica serica anderssoni Lönnberg, 1923 — the north of the species range, in southeastern Russia, far northeastern China, and the Korean Peninsula.

The two subspecies are very similar and intergrade extensively, with P. s. anderssoni being slightly larger on average and a little paler.

== Description ==
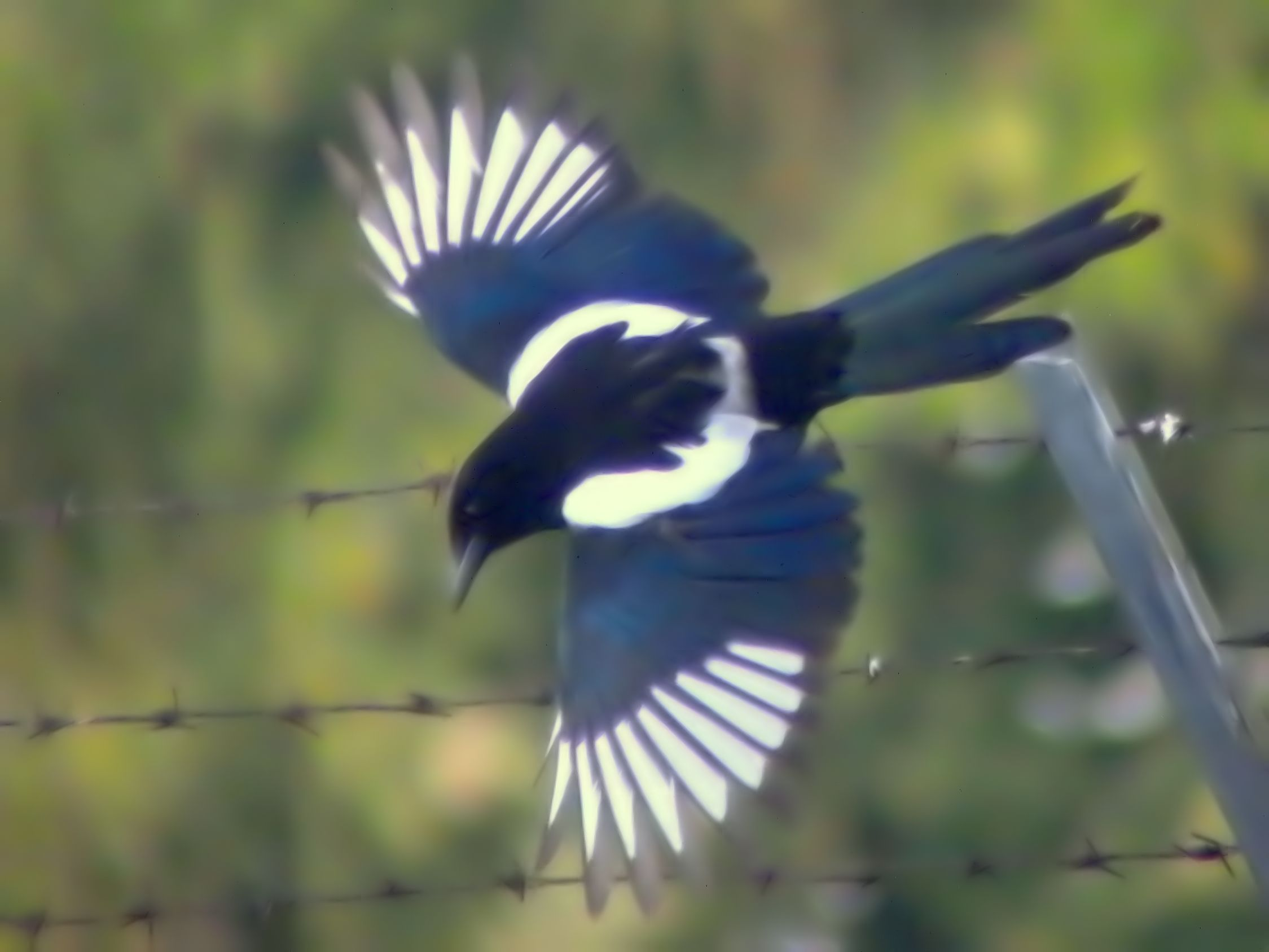
In flight, showing the white wing patches and the pale grey rump

It is 45 cm long. Compared to the Eurasian magpie, it is slightly smaller, with a proportionally shorter tail and longer bill and tarsi (lower legs), and darker with less white in the plumage. The back, tail, and particularly the remiges show (according to source) either bluer, less green iridescence compared to Eurasian magpie, or conversely, more green. The rump plumage is mostly black, with narrow, often greyish-white band, which connects the white shoulder patches as in its relatives. The Oriental magpie has the same call as the Eurasian magpie, though somewhat softer.

== Significance in East Asian culture ==
In China, magpies are seen as an omen of good fortune. This is reflected in the Chinese word for magpie, simplified Chinese: 喜鹊; traditional Chinese: 喜鵲; pinyin: xǐquè, in which the first character means "happiness". It was the official ‘bird of joy’ for the Qing dynasty. Qixi Festival, a holiday in China celebrating lovers, is based on the folktale The Cowherd and the Weaver Girl, in which a bridge of magpies reunite the lovers every year on the seventh day of the seventh lunar month.

In Korea, the magpie (까치, "kkachi") is celebrated as "a bird of great good fortune, of sturdy spirit and a provider of prosperity and development". In the same vein of bringing fortune and luck, Korean children were also taught that when you lose a tooth, to throw it on the roof singing a song for the magpie (까치야 까치야 헌 이 줄게). The bird will hear your song and bring you a new tooth. It is also a common symbol of the Korean identity, and has been adopted as the "official bird" of numerous South Korean cities, counties and provinces. According to a Korean folktale, magpies formed a bridge to help two star-crossed lovers reunite.

The Oriental magpie is the national bird of the Democratic People’s Republic of Korea, replacing the Eurasian goshawk in 2023.

In Japan, the Oriental magpie is a naturalised species, first introduced to northwestern Kyushu about 400 years ago by Korean immigrants. A smaller, more recently introduced population has been present in southern Hokkaido since the early 1990s, probably originating from birds arriving on timber cargo ships from Primoriye. Here, they are called Kasasagi 鵲, the name that is ordinarily used for the Eurasian magpie (Pica pica).
