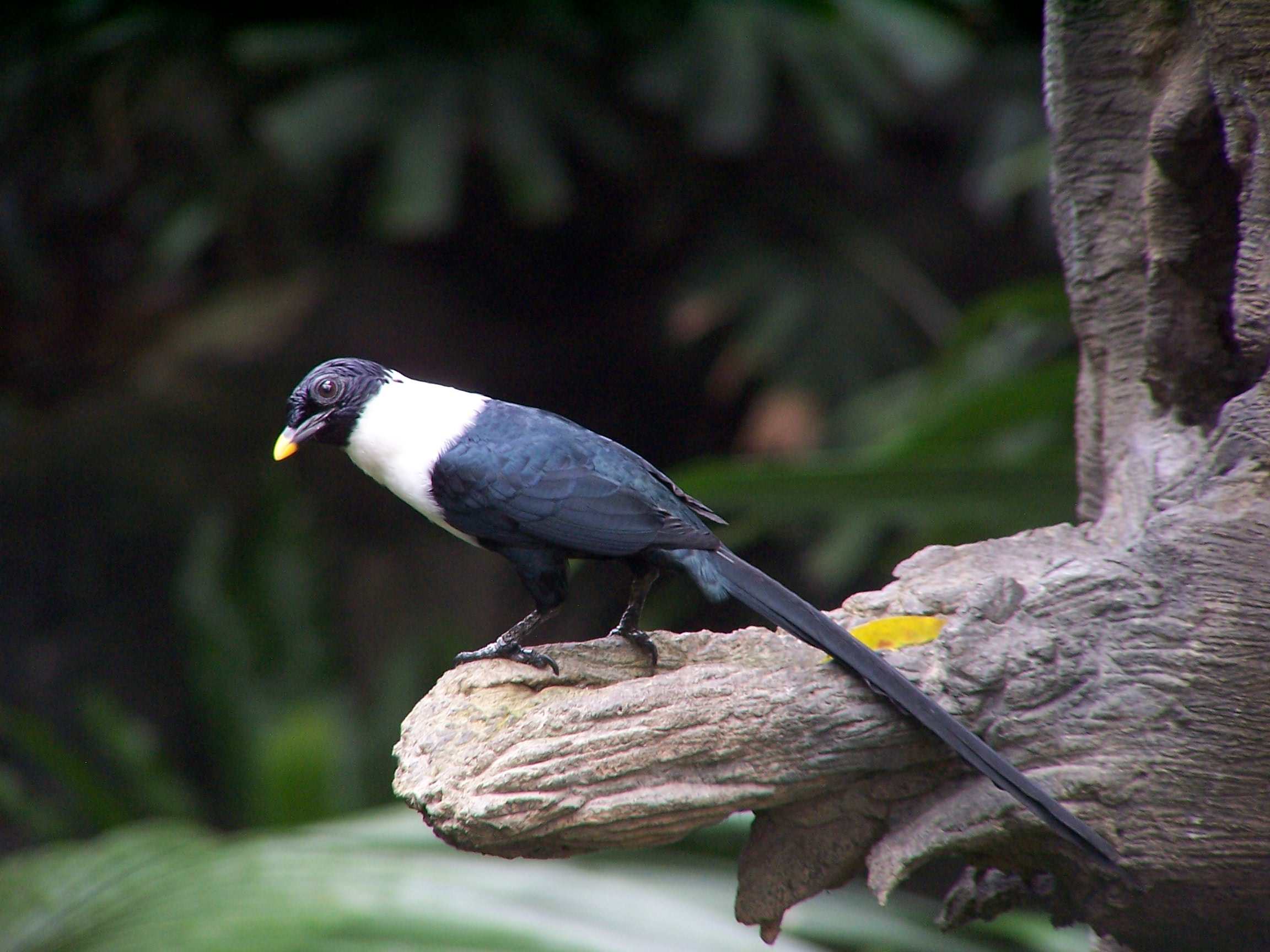
- White-necked myna (Streptocitta albicollis)

Scientific classification
- Kingdom: Animalia
- Phylum: Chordata
- Class: Aves
- Order: Passeriformes
- Family: Sturnidae
- Genus: Streptocitta; Bonaparte, 1850

Type species
- Corvus caledonicus Latham, 1801

Species
- Streptocitta albertinae Streptocitta albicollis

= Streptocitta =

Genus of birds

Streptocitta is a genus of large starlings in the family Sturnidae. Both species have a pied plumage and a long tail, giving them a superficial resemblance to a magpie. Although not closely related to the true magpies, they have therefore been referred to as magpies in the past. The two species are restricted to forests in Wallacea in Asia.

== Species ==
Image	Scientific name	Common name	Distribution
	Streptocitta albertinae	Bare-eyed myna	Indonesian islands of Taliabu and Mangole in the Sula Islands
	Streptocitta albicollis	White-necked myna	Sulawesi and adjacent smaller islands in Indonesia
