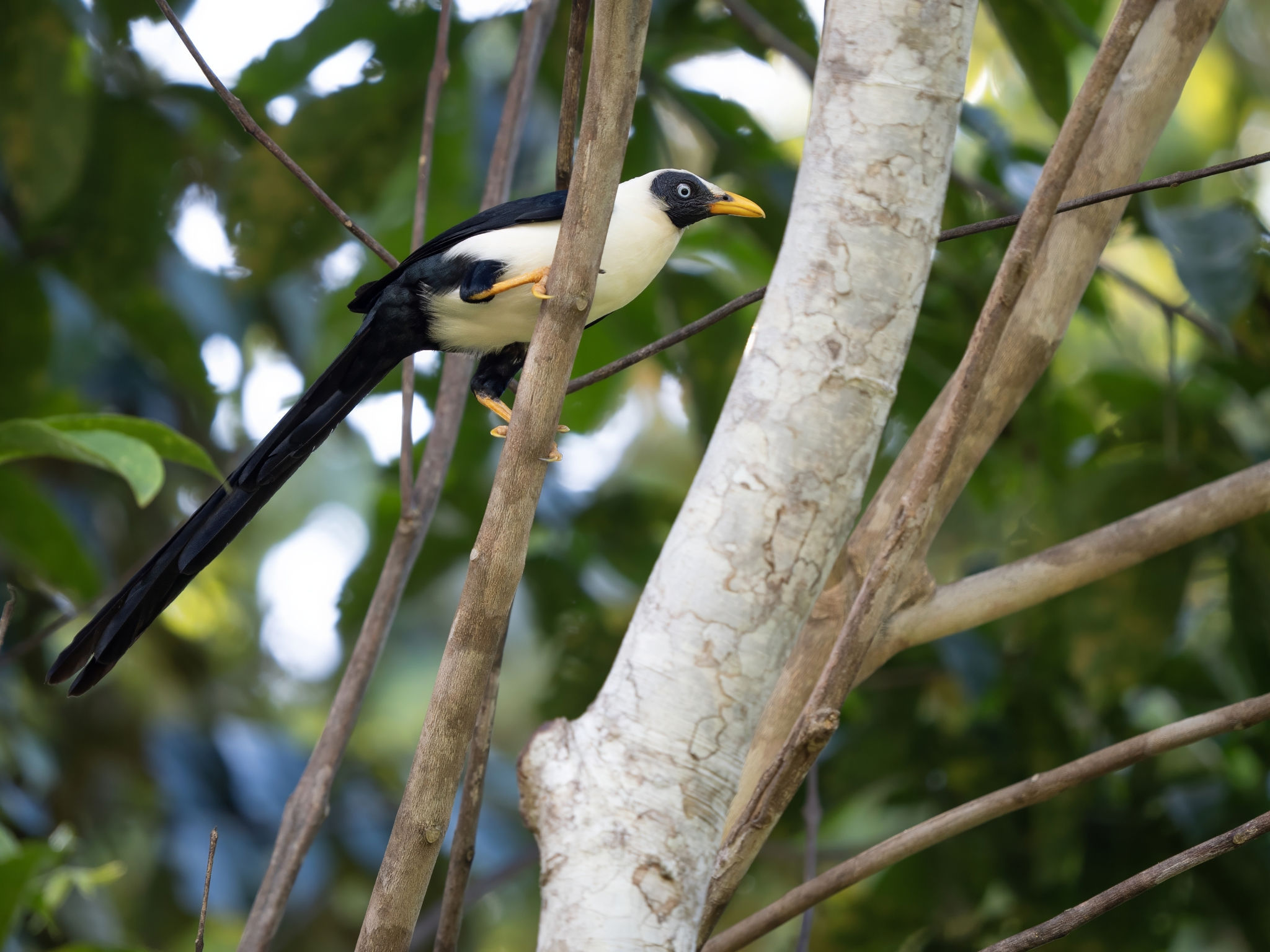

Conservation status
- Near Threatened (IUCN 3.1)

Scientific classification
- Kingdom: Animalia
- Phylum: Chordata
- Class: Aves
- Order: Passeriformes
- Family: Sturnidae
- Genus: Streptocitta
- Species: S. albertinae

Binomial name
- Streptocitta albertinae (Schlegel, 1865)

= Bare-eyed myna =

Species of bird

The bare-eyed myna (Streptocitta albertinae) is a large, long-tailed species of starling in the family Sturnidae. Its common name is a reference to the large patch of dark bare skin around the eyes. Due to its superficial resemblance to a magpie, it has been referred to as the Sula magpie in the past. It is endemic to tropical open lowland forests on the Indonesian islands of Taliabu and Mangole in the Sula Islands. It is threatened by habitat loss.
