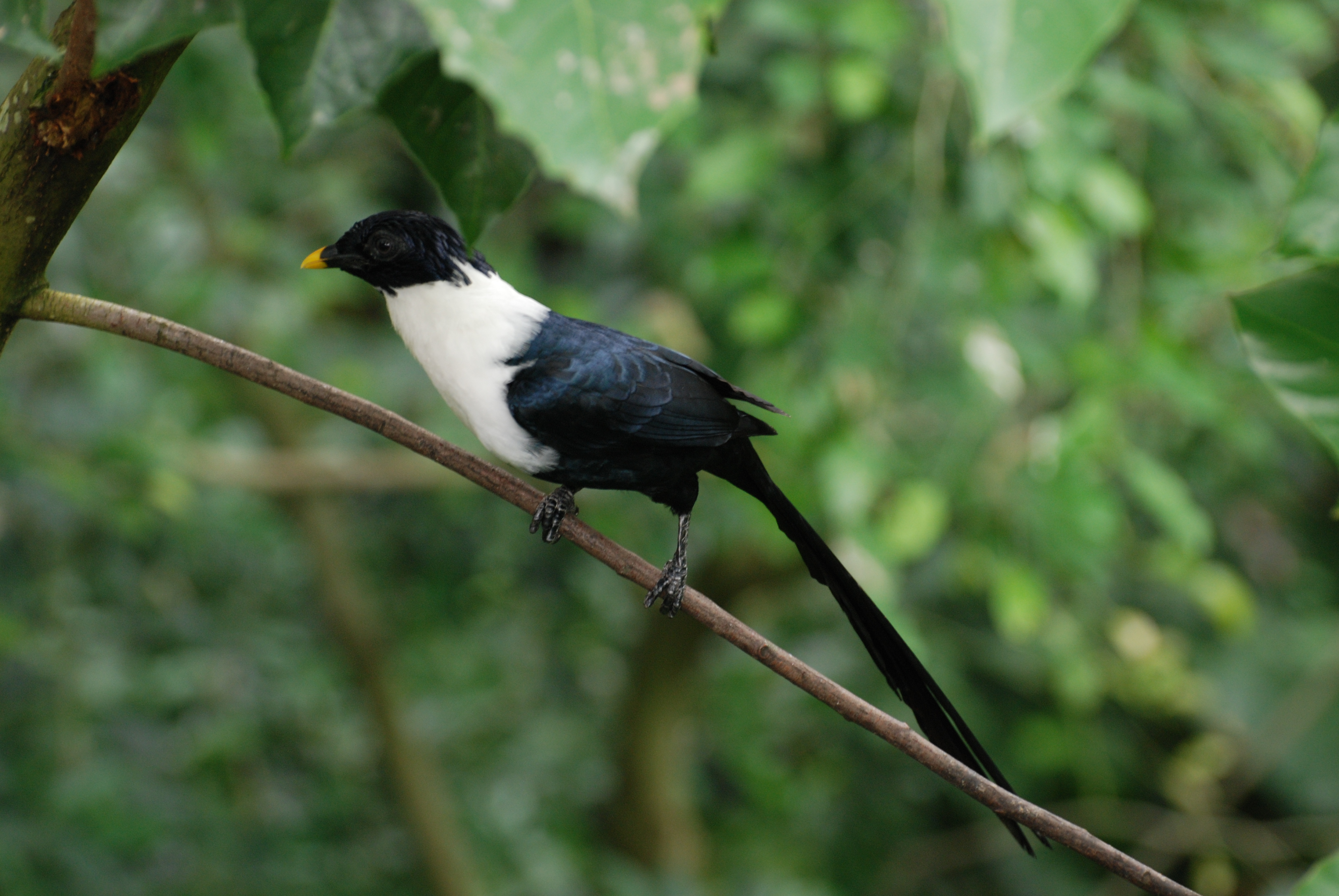

Conservation status
- Least Concern (IUCN 3.1)

Scientific classification
- Kingdom: Animalia
- Phylum: Chordata
- Class: Aves
- Order: Passeriformes
- Family: Sturnidae
- Genus: Streptocitta
- Species: S. albicollis

Binomial name
- Streptocitta albicollis (Vieillot, 1818)

= White-necked myna =

Species of bird

The white-necked myna (Streptocitta albicollis) is a large, long-tailed species of starling in the family Sturnidae. Due to its superficial resemblance to a magpie, it has been referred to as the Celebes magpie or Sulawesi magpie in the past. It is endemic to forests on Sulawesi and adjacent smaller islands in Indonesia. There are two subspecies: the nominate from the southern part of Sulawesi has a yellow-tipped bill, and torquata from the northern part of the island has an all-black bill.
