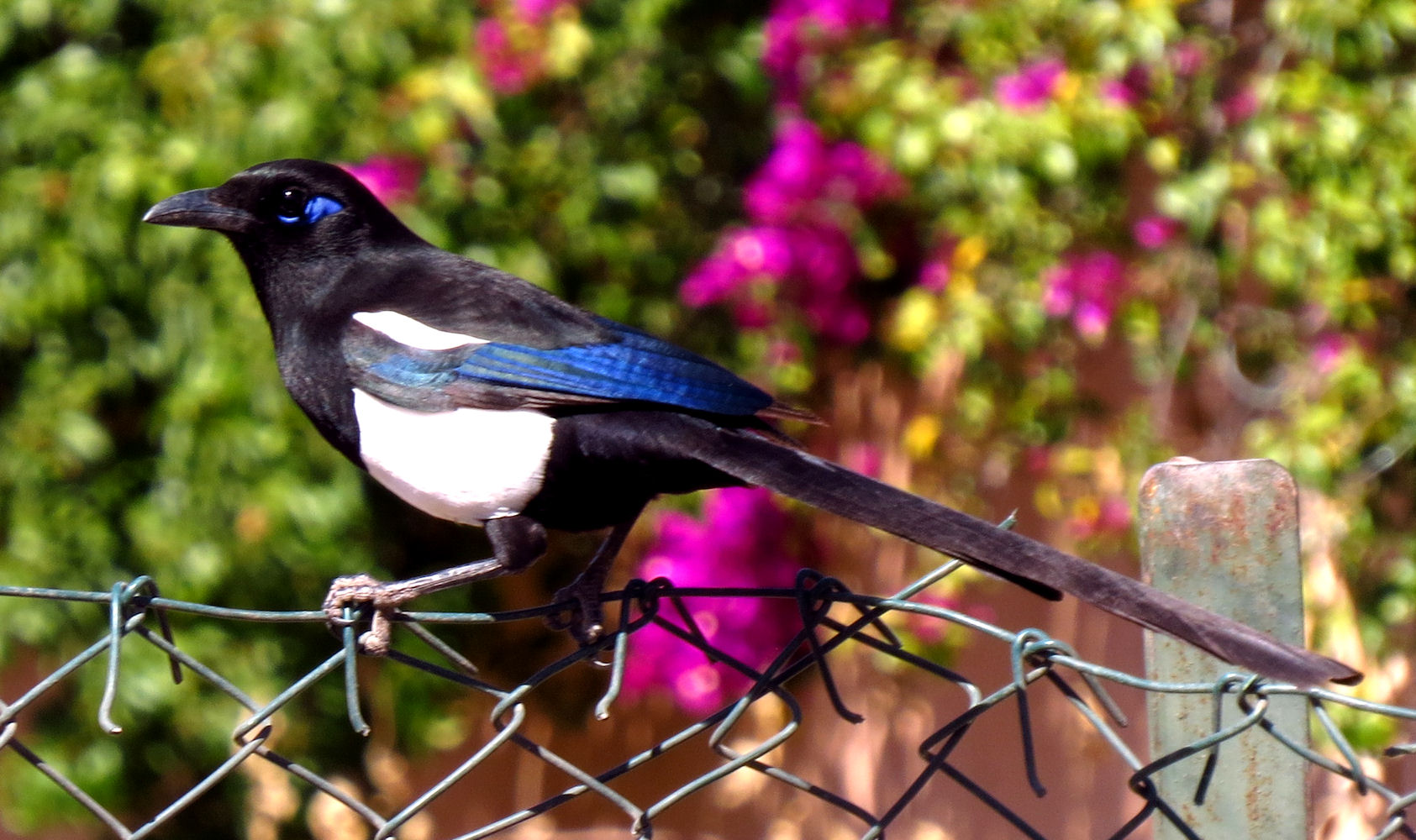
- In Marrakesh, Morocco

Conservation status
- Least Concern (IUCN 3.1)

Scientific classification
- Kingdom: Animalia
- Phylum: Chordata
- Class: Aves
- Order: Passeriformes
- Family: Corvidae
- Genus: Pica
- Species: P. mauritanica

Binomial name
- Pica mauritanica Malherbe, 1845
- Range of P. mauritanica Resident

= Maghreb magpie =

Species of bird

The Maghreb magpie (Pica mauritanica) is a species of magpie in the genus Pica found in North Africa from Morocco east to Tunisia, at altitudes from sea level up to 2,300 metres altitude. It can be distinguished from the Eurasian magpie by the patch of blue skin behind its eye, the narrower white belly, the shorter wings, and the longer tail.

== Taxonomy ==
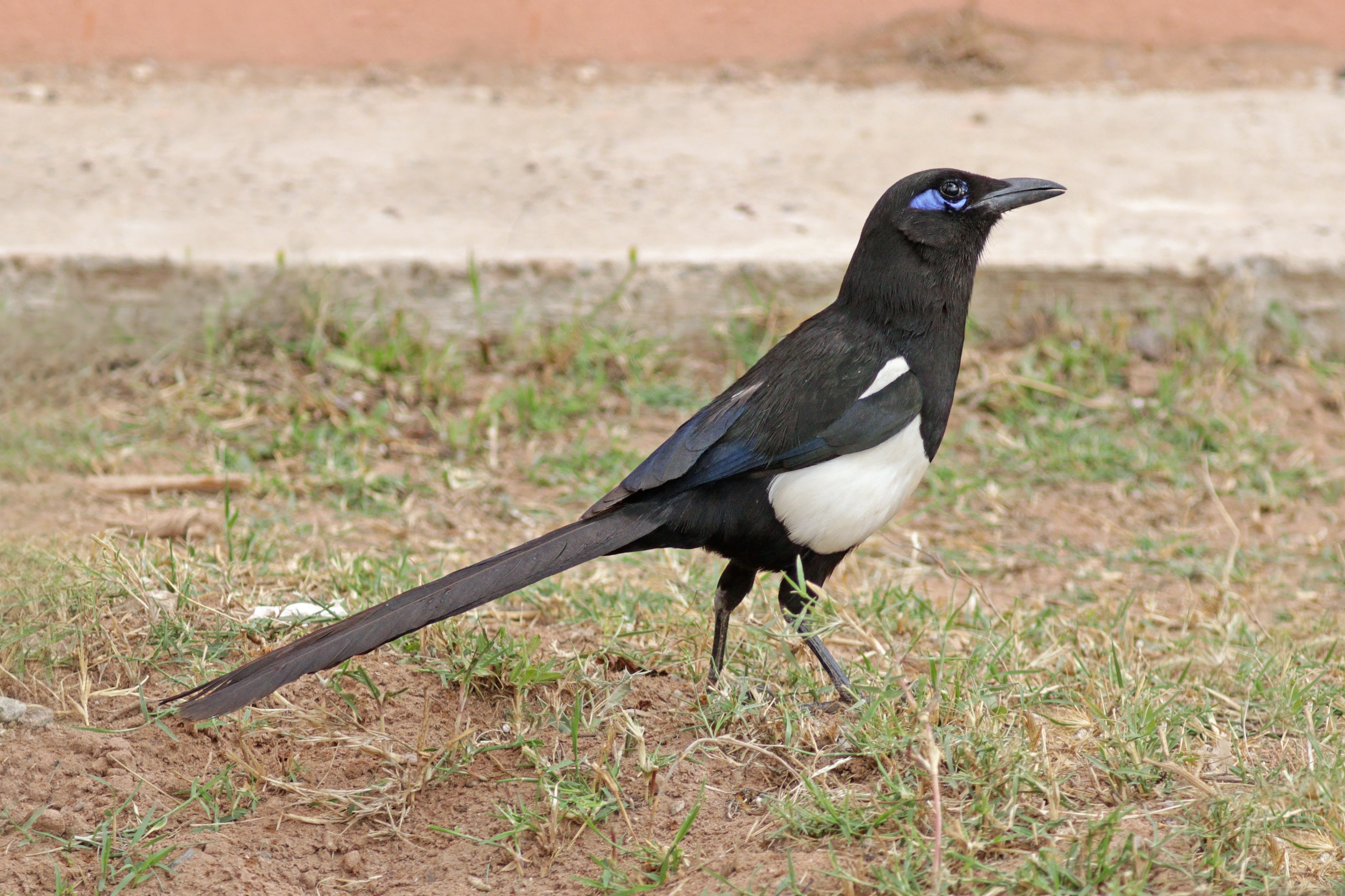
At Souss-Massa, Morocco

Maghreb magpie was first described as a species in 1845, a status retained by Richard Bowdler Sharpe in 1877 despite his reducing multiple other Pica names to synonyms of the Eurasian magpie, and by Joseph Whitaker in his 1905 The Birds of Tunisia. It was however reduced to a subspecies of the Eurasian magpie later in the 20th century.

A molecular phylogenetic study published in 2018 found that the Maghreb magpie was basal in the genus Pica, sister to a clade containing all of the other members of the genus; this leading to its restoration as a separate species by the IOC World Bird List in version 8.2 in July 2018.

== Description ==
The Maghreb magpie is around 48 cm long, similar in plumage to the widespread Eurasian magpie, but with the distinct patch of vivid blue bare skin behind the eye and on the lower eye lid. The white patch on the scapular ('shoulder') feathers is smaller (though not as small as in the Asir magpie of Arabia), as is the white belly patch. The blue skin around the eye is not entirely unique, as it is also recorded occasionally in the Iberian subspecies of the Eurasian magpie Pica pica melanotos, particularly in southern Spain.

== Status ==
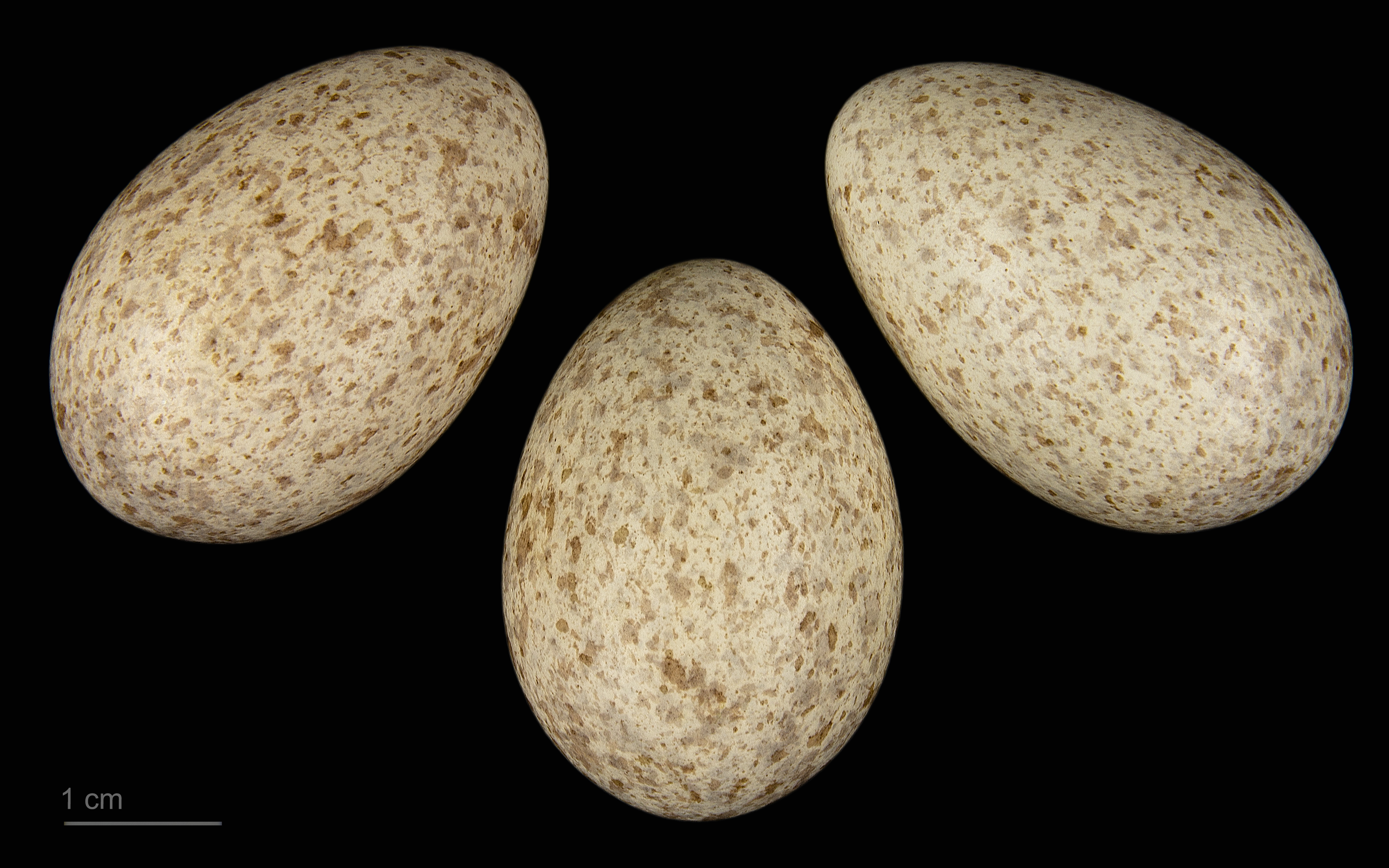
Pica pica mauritanica eggs (Muséum de Toulouse)

In recent years, the population of Maghreb magpie in Tunisia has been experiencing a decline. Research has shown that predation of nestlings by the great grey shrike (Lanius excubitor algeriensis), Egyptian cobra (Naja haje) and black rats (Rattus rattus) were the most important causes of nest failure. The species is also subject to brood parasitism by the great spotted cuckoo (Clamator glandarius).
