= Pica mourerae =

Pica mourerae Temporal range: Pliocene-Pleistocene

Scientific classification
- Kingdom: Animalia
- Phylum: Chordata
- Class: Aves
- Order: Passeriformes
- Family: Corvidae
- Genus: Pica
- Species: †P. mourerae

Binomial name
- †Pica mourerae Seguí, 2001

Extinct species of bird

Pica mourerae is an extinct species of magpie in the genus Pica that lived around the Plio-Pleistocene boundary.

== Distribution ==
Fossils of P. mourerae are known from the site of Pedrera de s'Ònix in Mallorca.
