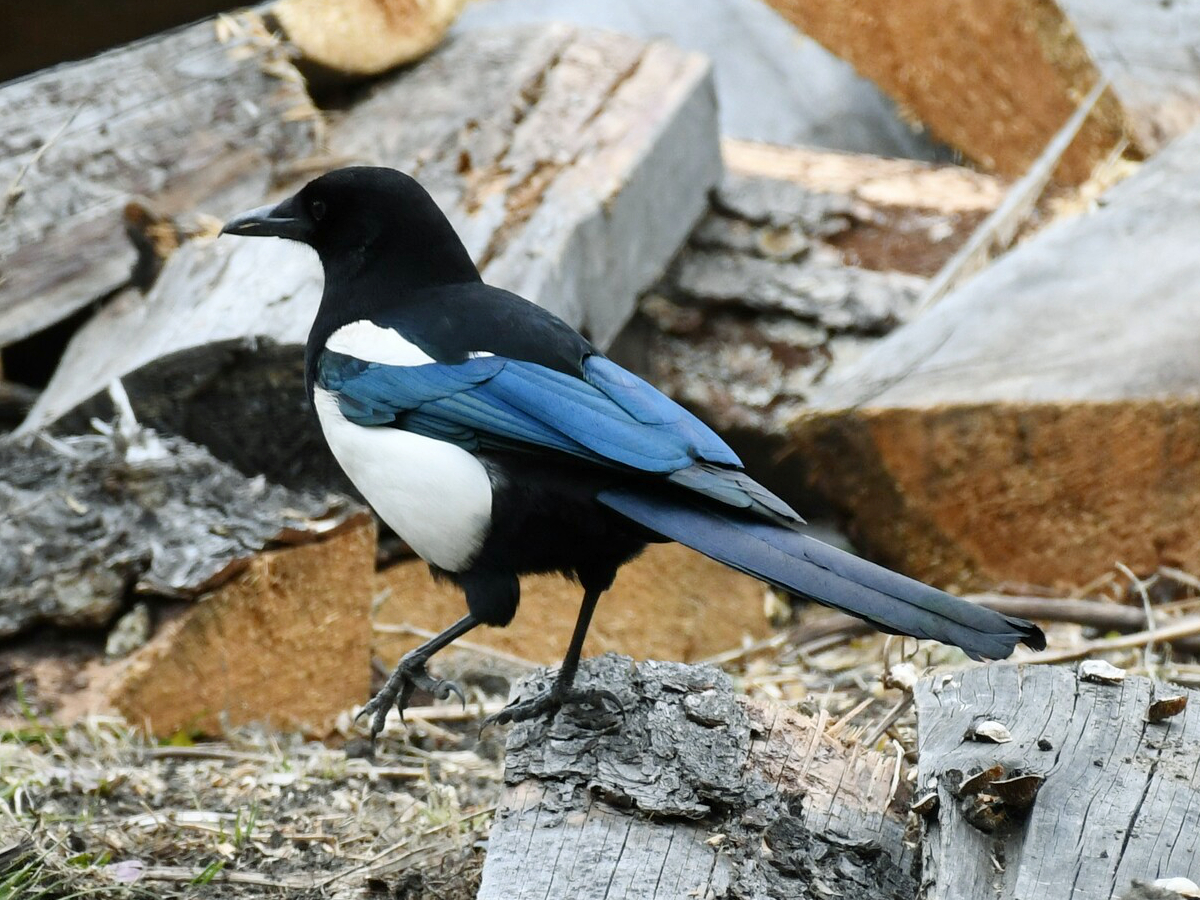
- In Bumthang, Bhutan

Scientific classification
- Kingdom: Animalia
- Phylum: Chordata
- Class: Aves
- Order: Passeriformes
- Family: Corvidae
- Genus: Pica
- Species: P. bottanensis

Binomial name
- Pica bottanensis Delessert, 1840
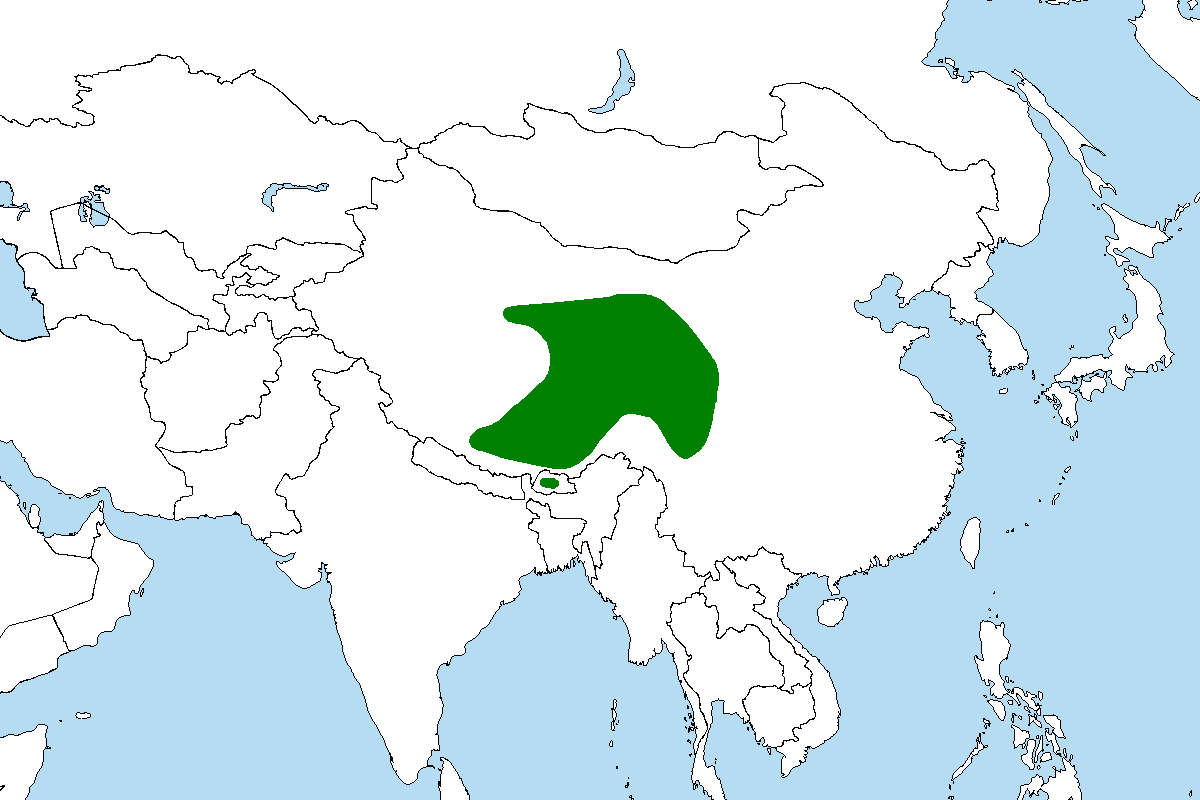

Synonyms
- P. pica bottanensis (Delessert, 1840)

= Black-rumped magpie =

Species of bird

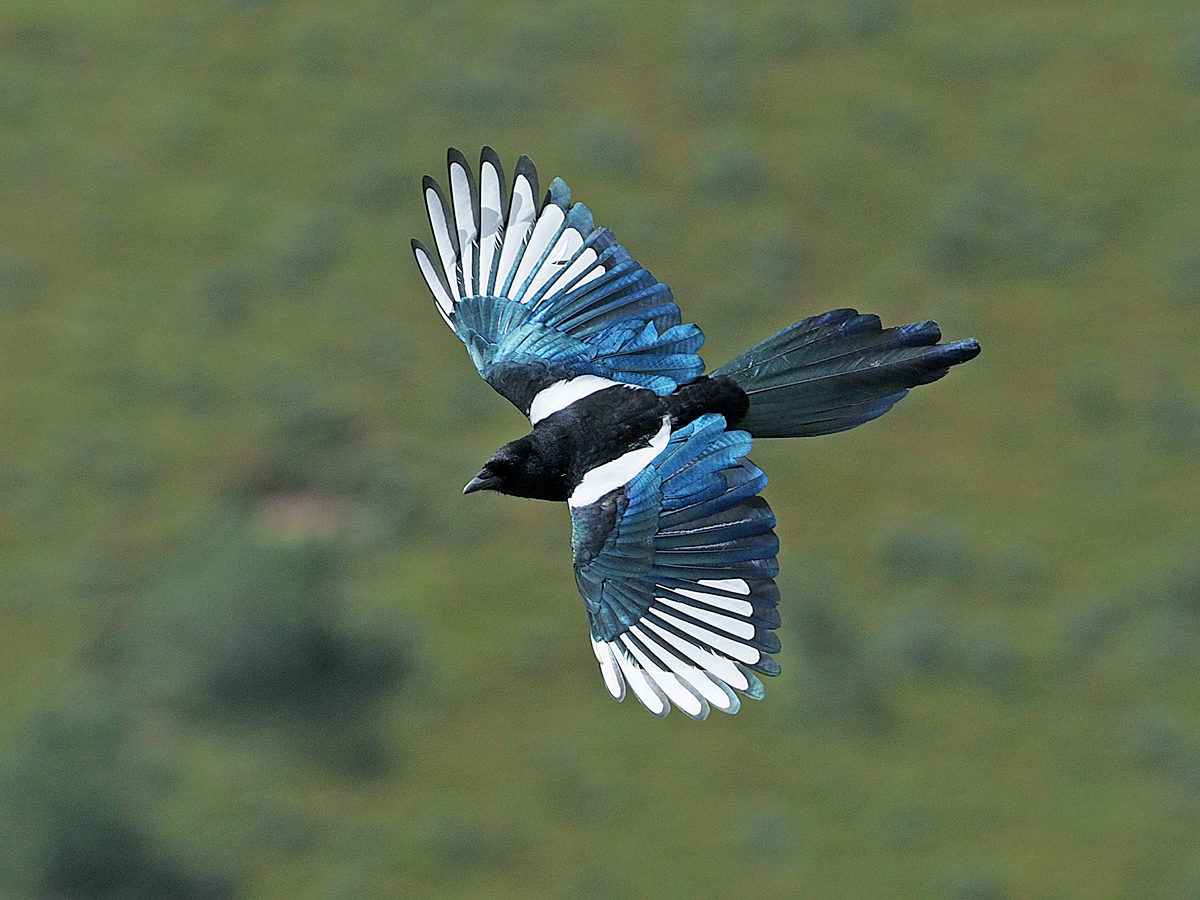
In flight, showing the lack of any white on the rump; Qinghai, China

The black-rumped magpie (Pica bottanensis) is a species of magpie native to west-central China and Bhutan, and possibly also irregularly in Sikkim in India, and in eastern Nepal. It is similar to other magpies in the genus Pica, with pied plumage with bluish-green iridescent wings and tail, but differs from the other species in the genus except for Asir magpie in having no white on the rump. It was described as a species in 1840, but had long been treated as a subspecies of Eurasian magpie, before being restored to species rank in 2018. In breeding behaviour it is largely similar to other Pica magpies, laying a single brood from April to June.

== Taxonomy ==
The black-rumped magpie was first described by Adolphe Delessert in 1840 as a species Pica bottanensis. In 1877, Richard Bowdler Sharpe dismissed it as a synonym of the Eurasian magpie, but this was strongly disputed by Allan Octavian Hume in 1877 and 1880, maintaining it as a distinct species. It remained accepted as a distinct species (with also probably the first citation of the English name 'Black-rumped Magpie') in Eugene W. Oates's 1889 The fauna of British India, including Ceylon and Burma. By 1928, Frank Ludlow cited it as a subspecies of Eurasian magpie, Pica pica bottanensis, as did E. C. Stuart Baker in his Nidification of Birds of the Indian Empire in 1932; that then remained the accepted status until a molecular phylogenetic study published in 2018 restored it to species rank, finding that it was a sister taxon to the Asir magpie from southwestern Saudi Arabia. It was later accepted as a full species by the IOC World Bird List in version 8.2. Its genus, Pica, comes from the Latin word pica, meaning "magpie". Its species name bottanensis is from the then-used French name for Bhutan, Bottan or Boutan.

== Description ==
The black-rumped magpie is black-and-white, with its namesake black rump, brighter plumage, stouter bill, and shorter tail being the main distinctive features from the closely related Oriental and Eurasian magpies. Its wings and tail are black with greeish-blue to purple iridescence, and large white stripes on the primary feathers visible in flight, while the flanks and central underparts are white. The wings are around 233–250 mm (9.2–9.8 in) for females and 241–259 mm (9.5–10.2 in) for males, with tails being 250 mm (9.8 in).

=== Vocal behaviour ===
Similar to many other corvids, the black-rumped magpie has a subdued, warbling song that is sometimes interrupted with high-pitched notes and rarely mimicry. Mainly sung by unpaired individuals, these songs are only audible at close range. Its typical call is a "raucous, explosive rapid chatter".

== Distribution and habitat ==
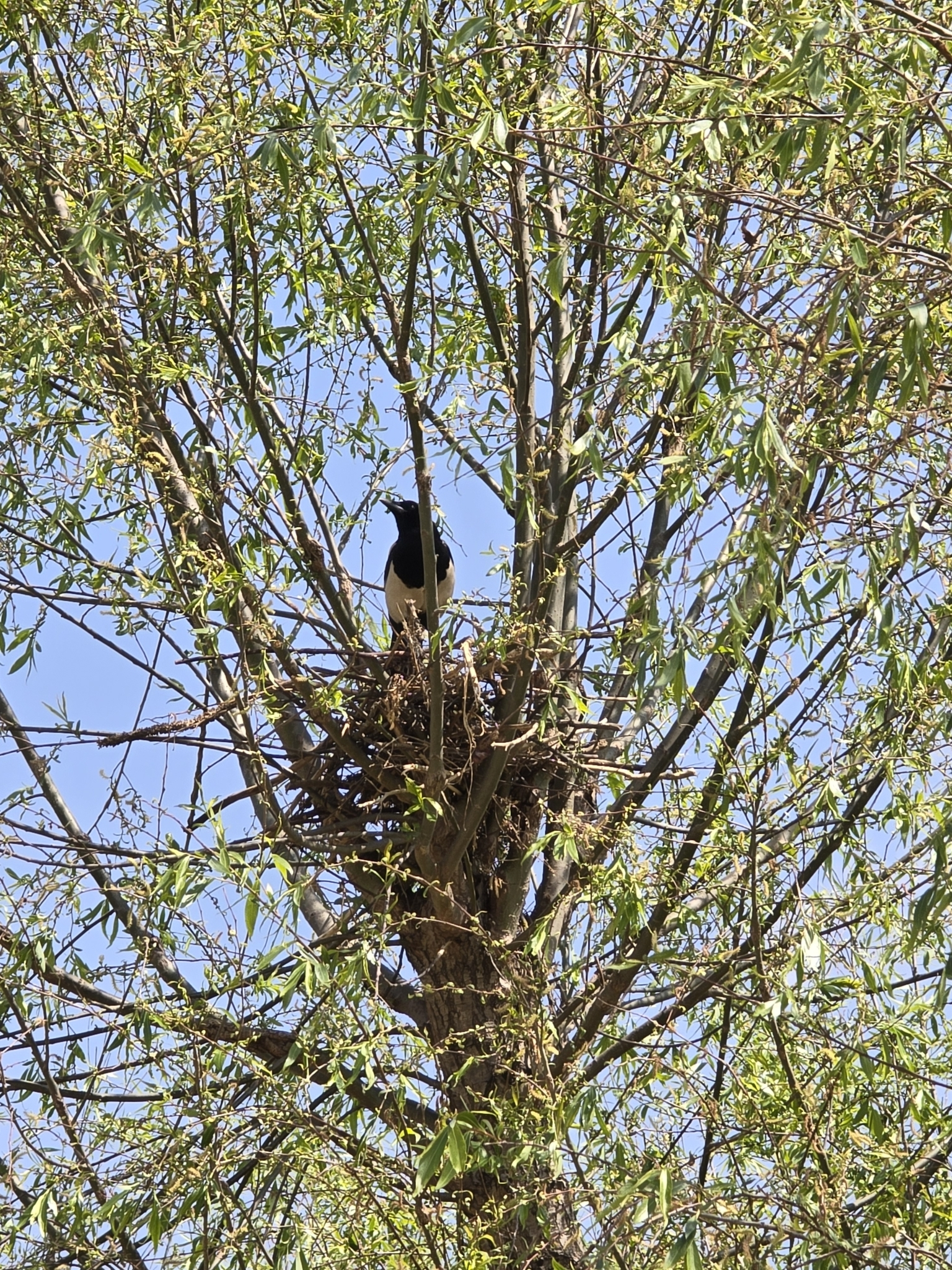
Nest building in Bumthang, Bhutan

The black-rumped magpie is found at high altitudes, with its entire range in or on the margins of the Tibetan Plateau, from central Bhutan to Qinghai and western Sichuan in west-central China, to eastern Tibet. It has been reported from Sikkim, with three specimens reportedly collected there by Louis Mandelli in 1873, but their exact collection location is unknown and may have been in Tibet. One in Kalimpong district, West Bengal, on 9 May 2023 was the first verified Indian record.

It is found in farmland and other semi-open habitat like farming districts, parks or gardens, and usually close to human habitation, at least in Bhutan. They are uncommon in the highest altitudes, but have been observed as high as 4,800 m (15,700 ft), with nests at 4,400 m (14,400 ft).

== Behaviour ==
Black-rumped magpie is monogamous, forming long-term pairs that persist across nesting seasons and even flocking. Like other magpies, they are social birds, often ecountered in pairs or family parties, and sometimes communal roosts of up to 30 birds.

Nest construction, handled by both sexes, begins in late March, with a single brood of eggs being laid around April to June. Clutches are usually 4–5 eggs; however, there can be as many or as few as 6 and 3 eggs. Black-rumped magpie nests are massive, domed structures, composed of twigs and plant fibres. Nests will occasionally be built on top of older nests.

The diet is largely carnivorous, consisting mainly of invertebrates, lizards, small mammals, frogs, other birds, and carrion. They primarily feed on the ground, side-hopping to catch prey, and holding their tail upwards while hunting. They occasionally perch on cattle and sheep to feed on ectoparasites.

== Conservation ==
The black-rumped magpie remains considered a subspecies of the Eurasian magpie by BirdLife International, which classifies it with that as least concern.
