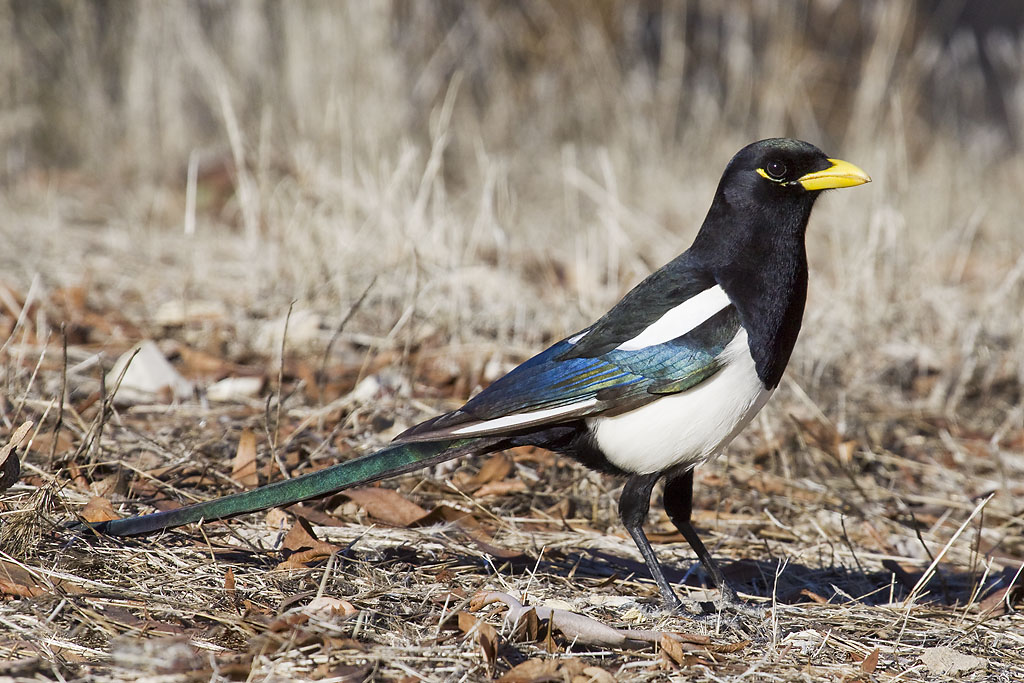
- Turlock, California

Conservation status
- Vulnerable (IUCN 3.1)

- Vulnerable (NatureServe)

Scientific classification
- Kingdom: Animalia
- Phylum: Chordata
- Class: Aves
- Order: Passeriformes
- Family: Corvidae
- Genus: Pica
- Species: P. nuttallii

Binomial name
- Pica nuttallii (Audubon, 1837)

Synonyms
- Pica nutallii (Audubon, 1837) [orth. error]

= Yellow-billed magpie =

Yellow-billed magpie Temporal range: Late Pleistocene–present

Species of bird

The yellow-billed magpie (Pica nuttallii), also known as the California magpie, is a bird that is endemic to California's Central Valley and the adjacent chaparral foothills and mountains. Apart from its having a yellow bill and a yellow streak around the eye and being slightly smaller, it is virtually identical to the black-billed magpie (Pica hudsonia) found in much of the rest of western North America. The scientific name commemorates the English naturalist Thomas Nuttall.

== Taxonomy ==
Audubon first named the species in 1837 using the spelling "nutallii". This mis-spelling of Nuttall's name was soon corrected by subsequent authors, but most recent literature has used the spelling "nuttalli", itself also an error as the original Latin ending -ii must be retained; the correct spelling is thus nuttallii.

mtDNA sequence analysis indicates a close relationship between the yellow-billed magpie and the black-billed magpie, rather than between the outwardly more similar black-billed and Eurasian magpies (P. pica); it is possibly even genetically embedded within black-billed magpie, but this is not certain.

Combining fossil evidence and paleobiogeographical considerations with the molecular data indicates that the yellow-billed magpie's ancestors became isolated in California quite soon after the ancestral magpies colonized North America due to early ice ages and the ongoing uplift of the Sierra Nevada, but that during interglacials there occurred some gene flow between the yellow- and black-billed magpies until reproductive isolation was fully achieved in the Pleistocene.

== Description ==
It is a medium-sized corvid, at 43–54 centimeters (17–21 in) long averaging slightly smaller than the black-billed magpie's 45–60 cm (18–24 in) but overlapping with it. Like other magpies in the genus Pica, it has pied plumage, with black head, back, rump, vent, wings, and tail, and white belly and shoulders. The black feathering, particularly the tail and wing feathers, are glossed iridescent in good light, reflecting variably green, blue, purple, or bronzed, depending on the angle of the light. The wing primary feathers are also white on the inner vane; this is not visible when perched, but shows as a white outer wing patch in flight. The bill is bright yellow, and it also has a small patch of yellow bare skin around the eyes. The eyes and legs are black. The sexes are identical in plumage, but males average slightly heavier than females, with weights of 151–189 g and 126–158 g respectively.

The calls are similar to those of black-billed magpie but marginally higher-pitched.

== Behavior ==
The yellow-billed magpie is gregarious and roosts communally. There may be a cluster of communal roosts in one general area made up of a central roost containing many birds and several outlying roosts with fewer.

Yellow-billed magpie flocks are known to engage in funeral-like behavior for their dead. When a magpie dies, a gathering of them congregates around the deceased bird where they call out loudly for 10–15 minutes.

The yellow-billed magpie is adapted to the hot summers of California's Central Valley and experiences less heat stress than the black-billed magpie.

=== Breeding ===
The yellow-billed magpie prefers groves of tall trees along rivers and near open areas, though in some cities they have begun to nest in vacant lots and other weedy places. A pair of birds build a dome-shaped nest with sticks and mud on a high branch. Nests maybe 14 meters above the ground and are sometimes built far out on long branches to prevent predators from reaching them. They nest in small colonies, or occasionally alone. Even when nesting close to other birds they may exhibit some territorial behavior. These birds are permanent residents and do not usually wander far outside of their breeding range.

Extra-pair copulation is not uncommon among yellow-billed magpies. After mating, a male will exhibit mate-guarding, preventing the female from mating with other males until she lays the first egg. The clutch contains 5 to 7 eggs which are incubated by the female for 16 to 18 days. Both parents feed the nestlings a diet of mostly insects until fledging occurs in 30 days.

=== Food and feeding ===
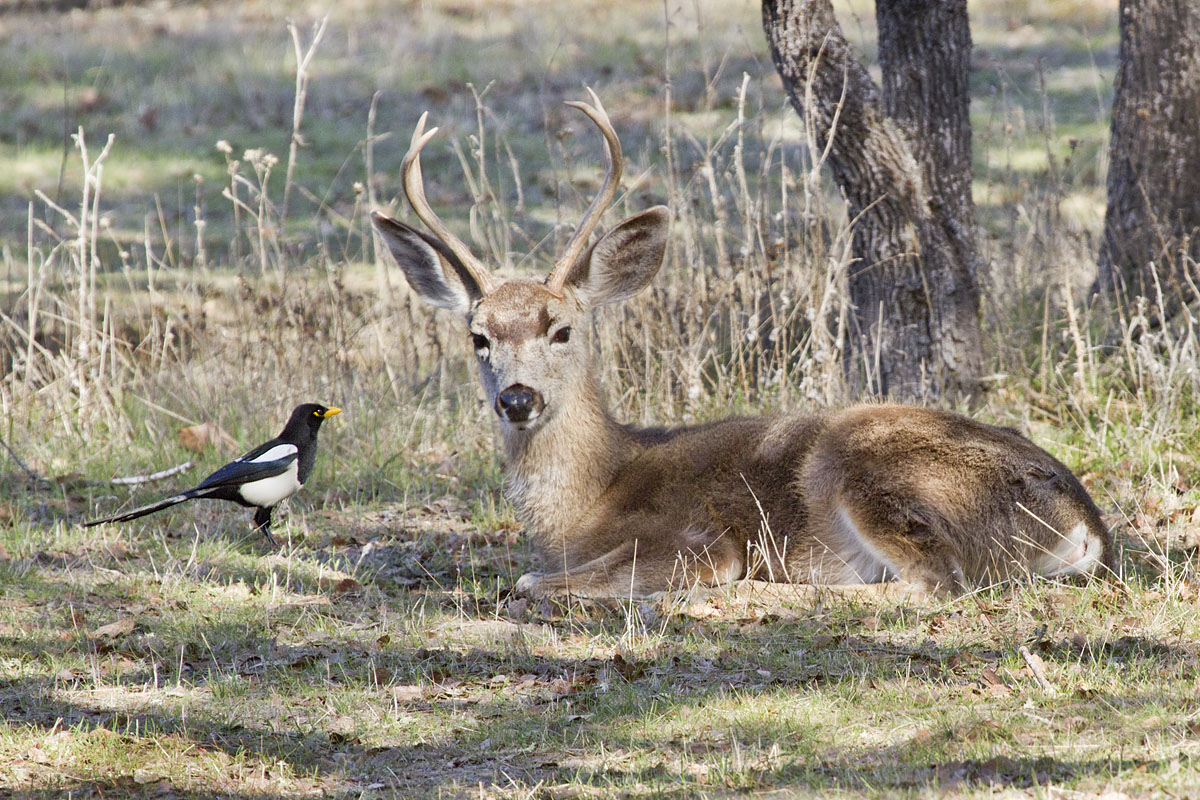
With black-tailed deer in California

These omnivorous birds forage on the ground, mainly eating insects, especially grasshoppers, but also carrion, acorns and fruit in fall and winter. They are attracted to recently butchered carcasses on farms and ranches. They pick through garbage at landfills and dumping sites, and sometimes hunt rodents.

== Diseases ==
This bird is extremely susceptible to West Nile virus. Between 2004 and 2006 it is estimated that 50% of all yellow-billed magpies died of the virus. Because the bird tends to roost near water bodies such as rivers, it is often exposed to mosquitoes.

Avian poxvirus is another contagious viral infection that yellow-billed magpies face that have raised concerns for their population. It has been documented in some individuals, leading to the development of skin lesions, nodules, and sometimes death. While the prevalence of avian poxvirus in yellow-billed magpies varies, it is considered a potential concern for the species.

The birds are also at risk of lead poisoning, primarily due to the ingestion of spent lead ammunition fragments found in carrion or discarded game animals. Lead poisoning has been a significant issue for scavenging birds, and efforts to reduce the use of lead ammunition in hunting areas adjacent to yellow-billed magpie habitats are being undertaken to mitigate this threat.

== Conservation ==
The IUCN classifies the bird as a vulnerable species. The Nature Conservancy places it in the vulnerable category. Besides West Nile Virus, threats include loss of habitat and rodent poison. The bird has a limited area of distribution but is widespread throughout the area and still common in many places.

Habitat Loss is the ongoing urbanization and agricultural development in California's Central Valley have led to the destruction and fragmentation of the yellow-billed magpie's preferred nesting and foraging habitats. As groves of tall trees are cleared for development, the available breeding sites for these birds are diminishing.

Rodent Poison also is the use of rodenticides and pesticides in agricultural and urban areas poses a direct threat to the yellow-billed magpie population. These chemicals can contaminate the bird's food sources and have detrimental effects on their health.

Climate Change and its associated impacts, such as increased temperatures and altered precipitation patterns, may affect the availability of the bird's food sources and nesting sites. Prolonged droughts and extreme weather events can further stress their populations.

Conservation Efforts where several organizations, including The Nature Conservancy and local conservation groups, are actively engaged in efforts to protect and preserve the yellow-billed magpie. These efforts include habitat restoration, monitoring of populations, and education campaigns to raise awareness about the importance of safeguarding this species.
