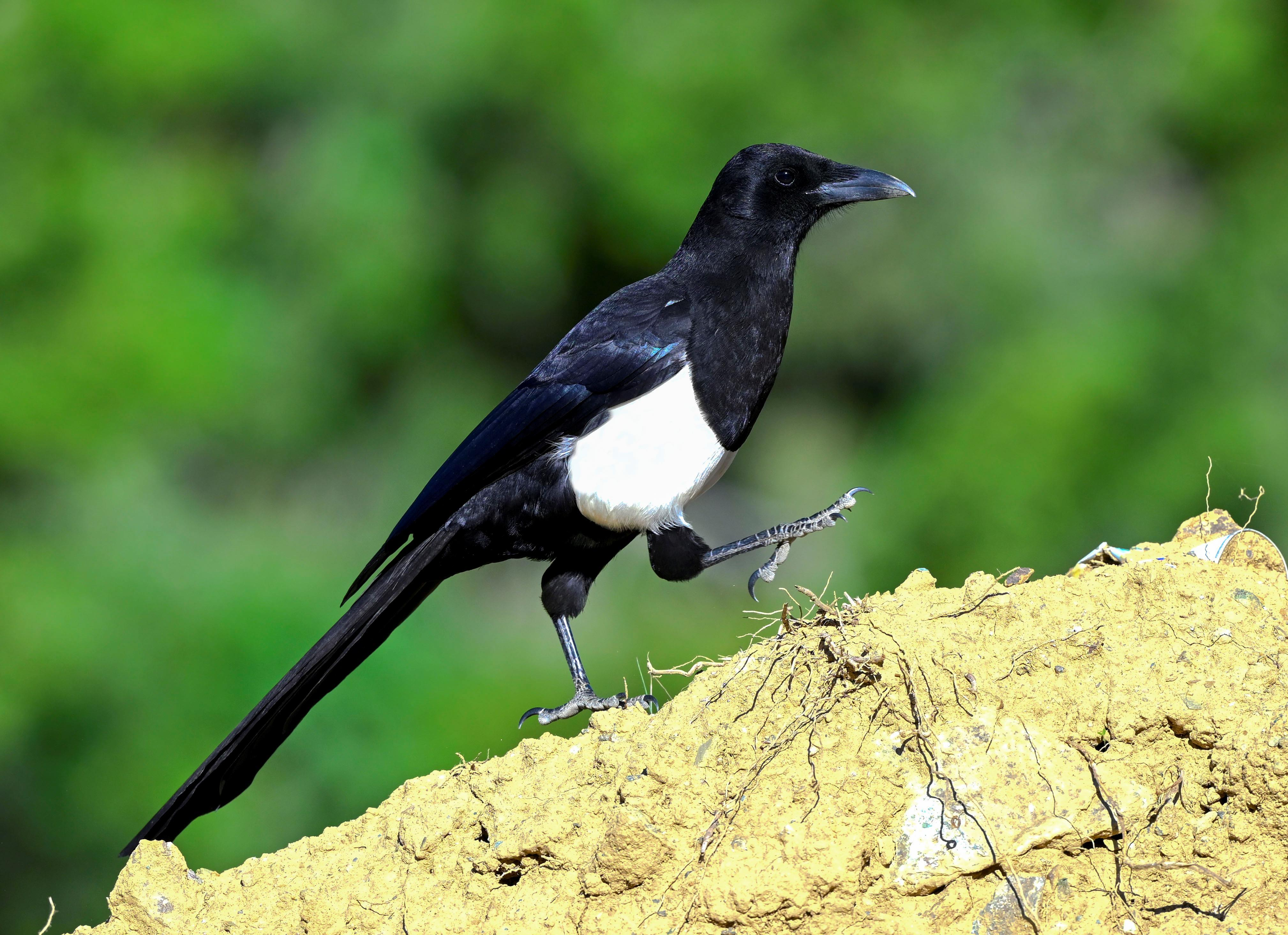

Conservation status
- Endangered (IUCN 3.1)

Scientific classification
- Kingdom: Animalia
- Phylum: Chordata
- Class: Aves
- Order: Passeriformes
- Family: Corvidae
- Genus: Pica
- Species: P. asirensis

Binomial name
- Pica asirensis Bates, 1936
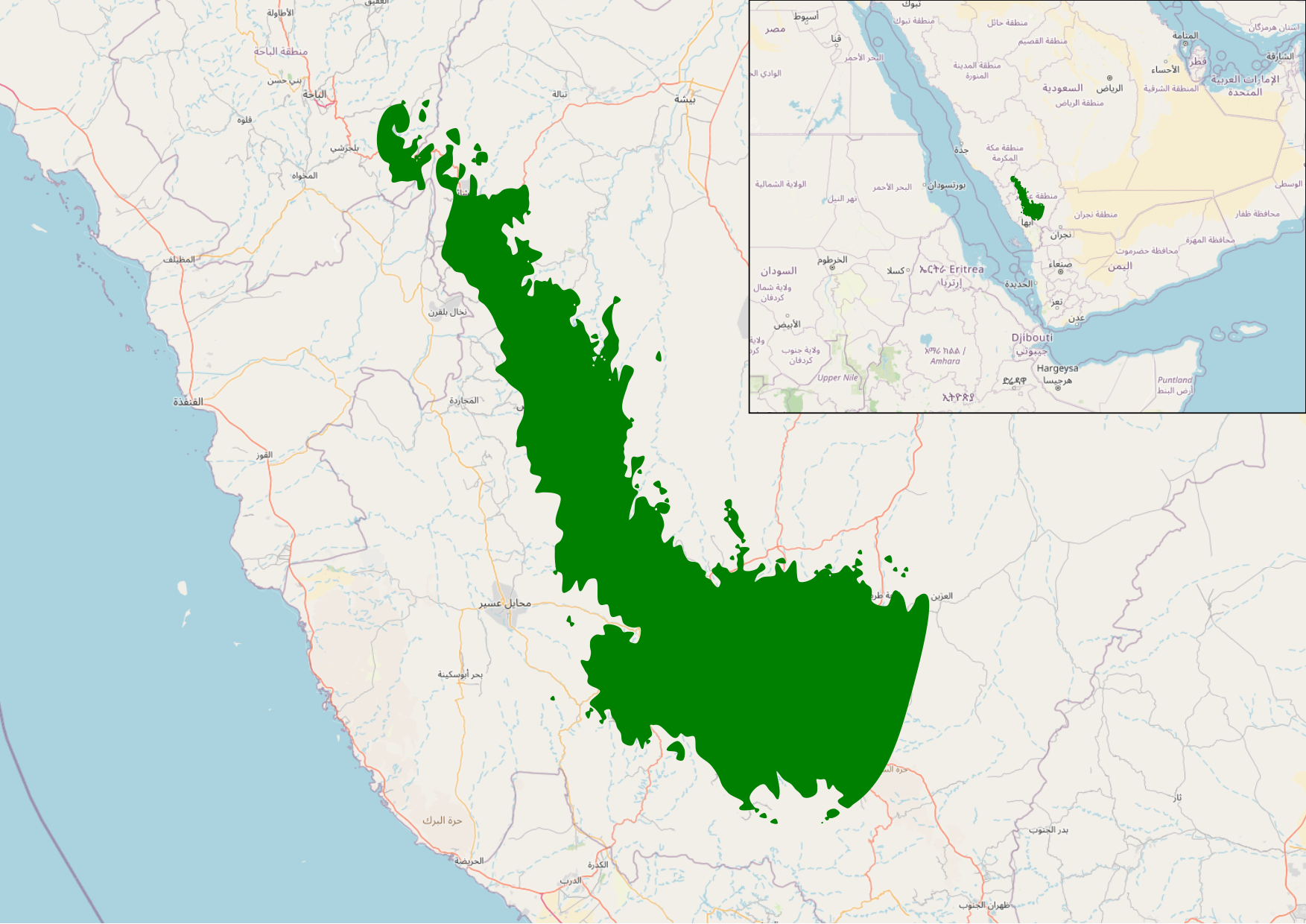

= Asir magpie =

Species of bird

The Asir magpie (Pica asirensis), also known as the Arabian magpie, is a highly endangered species of magpie endemic to Saudi Arabia. It is only found in the country's southwestern highlands, in the Asir Mountains. It occurs only in African juniper forest in well-vegetated wadis and valleys. It was originally described as a subspecies of the Eurasian magpie as Pica pica asirensis, and still is by some authorities. This species is highly threatened by habitat destruction, as its native forests are not regenerating. Tourism development and climate change are also posing a threat. Only 135 pairs (270 mature individuals) are known to survive in the wild, and this number is declining.

A molecular phylogenetic study published in 2018 found that the Asir magpie was a sister taxon to the black-rumped magpie of the Tibetan Plateau, with which it also shares a black rump, unlike the other Pica magpies.

== Description ==
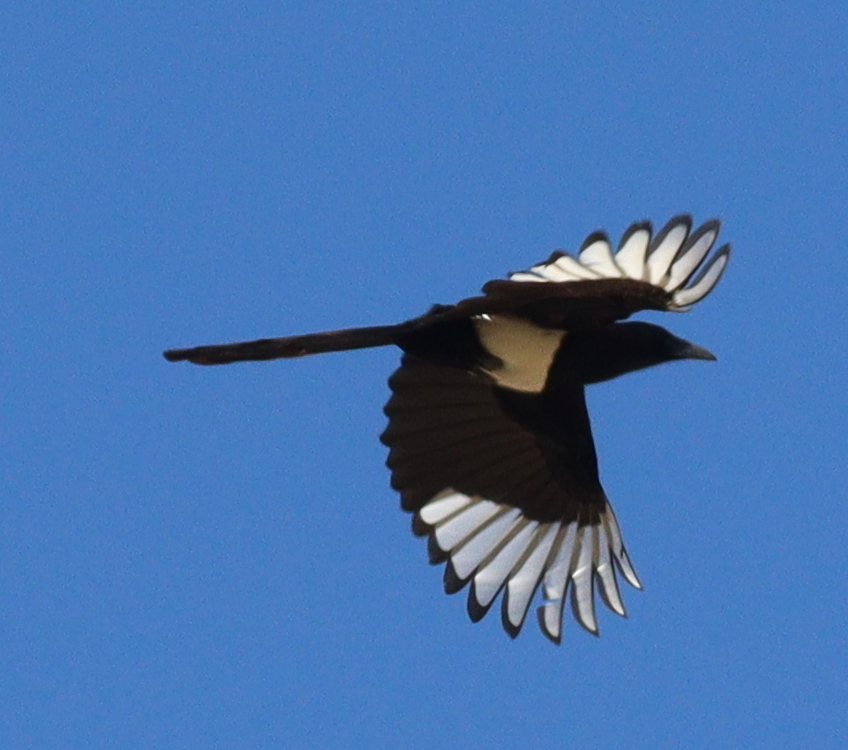
Asir magpie in flight

The Asir magpie (Pica asirensis) is about 45–46 cm (18–18 in) long, and its weight is 200–240 g (7.1–8.5 oz). Its head, neck, back, front chest, rump, and feet are all black. Its shoulders and belly are white. Its tail is black with purple to bronze-green iridescence. Compared to the Eurasian magpie, the Asir magpie has longer and stouter bill and legs, darker plumage with reduced white on the scapulars, and a black rump. Its voice is also distinct, "a mournful prolonged screech" and it also gives a loud "quaynk-quaynk" call. There is no difference between males and females, but juvenile Asir magpies are duller than adults, with no white scapular patch, and less iridescent wing and tail feathers.

== Habitat ==
The Asir magpie primarily lives above 2,150 m (7,050 ft), mostly from 2,400–3,000 m (7,900–9,800 ft), in thick shady African juniper forests or dense mixed forests. It usually lives on south-facing slopes and avoids living on slopes larger than 30 degrees or near a human site. Sometimes, the Asir magpie is also observed foraging on roadsides or living at 1,800 m (5,900 ft) and higher.

Asir magpies usually group in pairs and live in flocks; the flocks typically contain up to seven birds, likely family parties.

The Asir magpie is omnivorous. Its diet varies according to the changes in seasons. When breeding, it mainly feeds on animal-based food such as caterpillars. During the rest of the year, it relies on seeds, including berry-like juniper cones and figs, and also visits picnic sites to eat scraps (boiled rice, fruit, etc.) left by people.

== Status ==
A highly endangered species, there are only 270 Asir magpies estimated to exist, and the extent of occurrence (breeding/resident) has shrunk to 42,700 km^{2} (16,500 sq mi). When Bates first recorded the Asir magpie, the bird's living range extended from Tayif in the north to at least Abha in the south, a distance of 400 km (250 mi). Today, the great majority of the population appears to be confined to pockets of mixed juniper and acacia forests within a 37 km (23 mi) strip of highlands, primarily between An-Namas and Billasmar. A high degree of habitat fragmentation from tourism development and urban expansion poses a great threat to its existence by restraining the exchange of genetic materials between groups from different habitats. Moreover, Asir magpies may suffer from malnutrition as a result of feeding on human food waste of poor nutritional quality, which could potentially lead to extinction of the species.

== See also ==
- Asir Mountains, Sarat range
