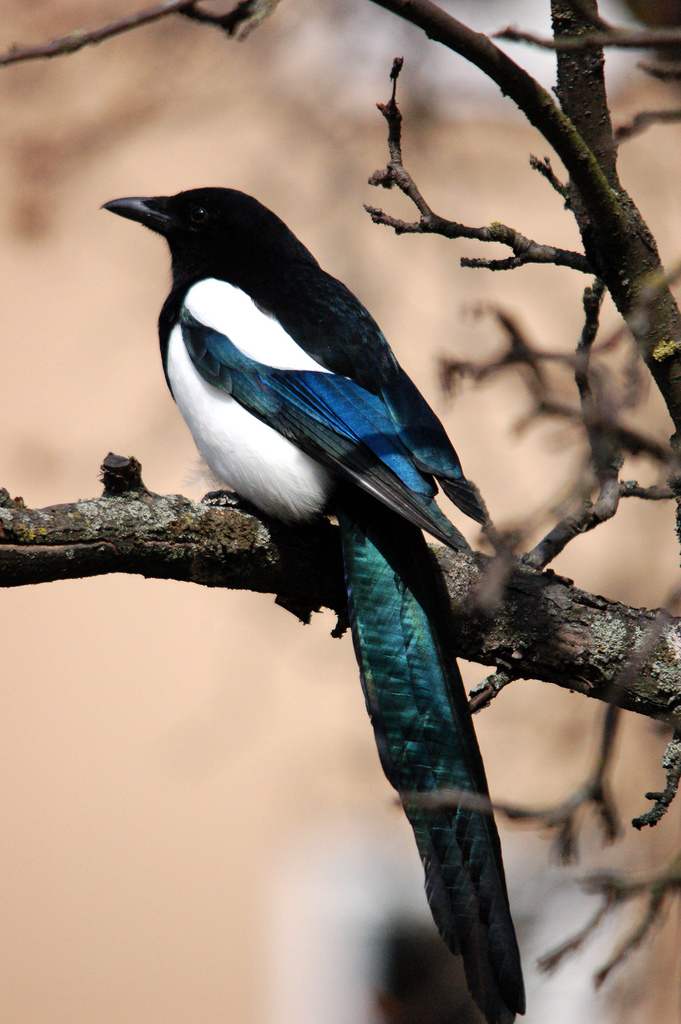
- Eurasian magpie (P. pica)

Scientific classification
- Kingdom: Animalia
- Phylum: Chordata
- Class: Aves
- Order: Passeriformes
- Family: Corvidae
- Subfamily: Corvinae
- Genus: Pica; Brisson, 1760

Type species
- Corvus pica Linnaeus, 1758

Species
- Pica pica; Pica serica; Pica mauritanica; Pica asirensis; Pica bottanensis; Pica nuttallii; Pica hudsonia

= Pica (bird) =

Pica Temporal range: Pliocene–Recent

Genus of birds

Pica is a genus of seven species of birds in the family Corvidae in both the New World and the Old. It is one of several corvid genera whose members are known as magpies. Pica have long tails and predominantly black and white plumage, with iridescent blue, green, purple and bronze colours on the wings and tail in good light. After Corvus, this genus is the second most widespread within the Corvidae family, being distributed across Eurasia, north Africa, and western North America. Molecular phylogeny suggests that Pica is most closely related to nutcrackers (Nucifraga), jackdaws (Coloeus) and crows and ravens (Corvus).

== Taxonomy ==
The genus Pica was introduced by the French zoologist Mathurin Jacques Brisson in 1760. He derived the name by tautonymy from the specific epithet of the Eurasian magpie Corvus pica which was introduced by Linnaeus in 1758. Pica is the Latin word for the Eurasian magpie.

In 2018, a molecular phylogenetic study found that the Eurasian magpie consisted of multiple species including the Maghreb magpie, the Asir magpie, the black-rumped magpie and the oriental magpie.

=== Species ===
The genus contains seven living species; species order follows AviList:

Genus Pica – Brisson, 1760 – seven species
Common name	Scientific name and subspecies	Range	Size and ecology	IUCN status and estimated population
Maghreb magpie	Pica mauritanica Malherbe, 1845	northwest Africa	Size: Habitat: Diet:	LC
Oriental magpie	Pica serica Gould, 1845 Two subspecies: P. s. serica – Gould, 1845; P. s. anderssoni – Lönnberg, 1923 (syn. P. s. jankowskii)	southeastern Russia and Myanmar to eastern China, Korea, Japan, Taiwan and northern Indochina	Size: Habitat: Diet:	LC
Black-rumped magpie	Pica bottanensis Delessert, 1840	central Bhutan, west-central China	Size: Habitat: Diet:	NE
Asir magpie	Pica asirensis Bates, 1936	Asir Region of Saudi Arabia	Size: Habitat: Diet:	EN
Eurasian magpie	Pica pica (Linnaeus, 1758) Six subspecies: P. p. fennorum – Lönnberg, 1927; P. p. pica – (Linnaeus, 1758); P. p. melanotos – A.E. Brehm, 1857; P. p. bactriana – Bonaparte, 1850; P. p. leucoptera – Gould, 1862; P. p. camtschatica – Stejneger, 1884	Europe and Asia	Size: Habitat: Diet:	LC
Black-billed magpie	Pica hudsonia (Sabine, 1823)	western half of North America	Size: Habitat: Diet:	LC
Yellow-billed magpie	Pica nuttallii (Audubon, 1837)	California	Size: Habitat: Diet:	VU

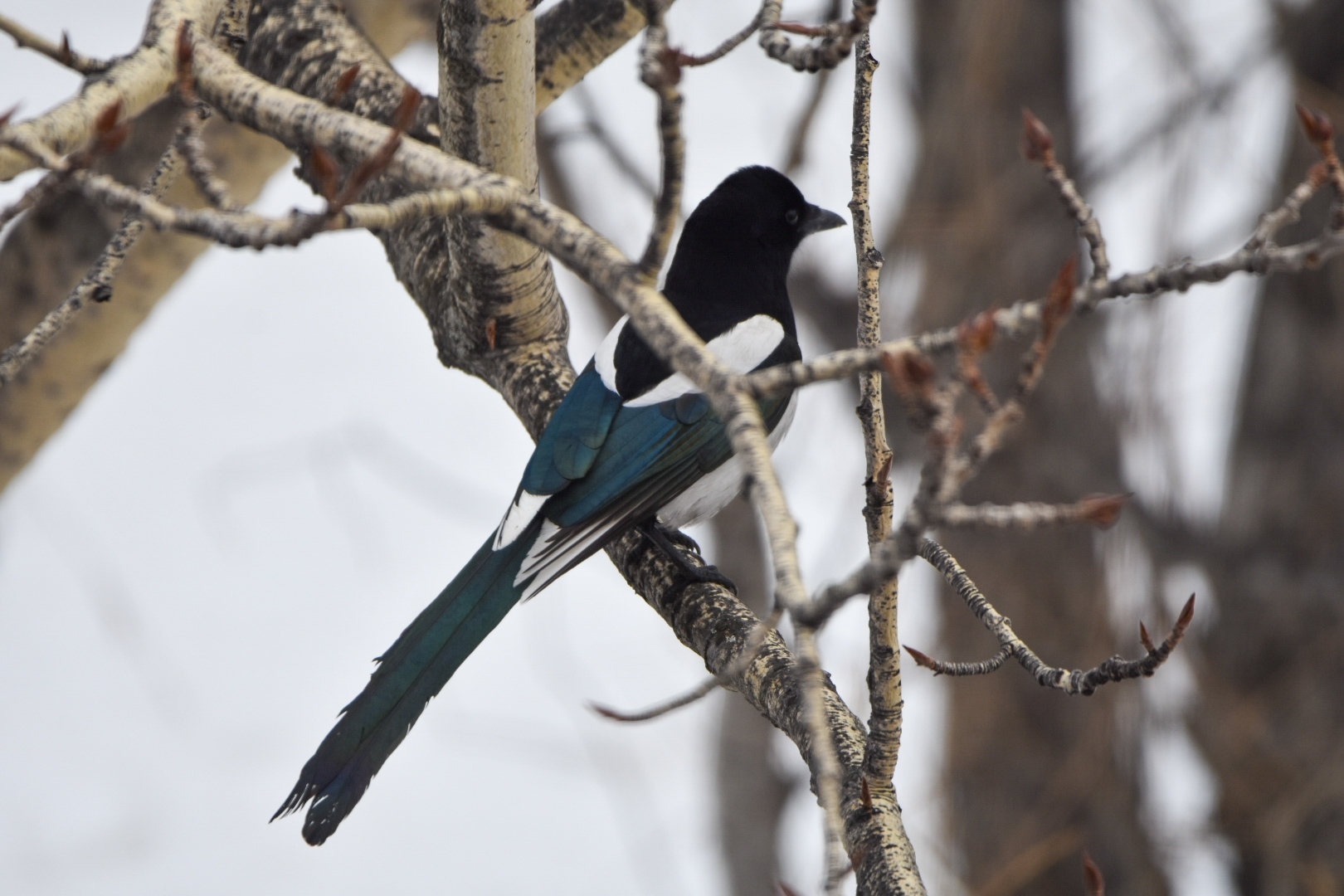
The geographically highly isolated magpie on Kamchatka, Pica pica camtschatica, with extensive white in its primaries, was recovered as sister to the rest of Pica pica by Kryukov et al., but was only weakly differentiated in Song et al.'s study. The east Siberian P. p. leucoptera has nearly as much white in the primaries.

This phylogeny was concluded by Gang Song et al.'s 2018 study; it included all the taxa.

- Pica
  - Maghreb magpie (Pica mauretanica)
  - - - Oriental magpie (Pica serica)
      - - Black-rumped magpie (Pica bottanensis)
        - Asir magpie (Pica asirensis)
    - - Eurasian magpie (Pica pica)
      - - Black-billed magpie (Pica hudsonia)
        - Yellow-billed magpie (Pica nuttallii)

A cladogram was established in A. P. Kryukov's 2025 study; note that it is only partial, with Asir and black-rumped magpies not included.

- Pica
  - - Eurasian magpie (P. pica)
    - - Black-billed magpie (P. hudsonia)
      - Yellow-billed magpie (P. nuttallii)
  - Maghreb magpie (P. mauritanica)
  - Oriental magpie (P. serica)

A range gap formerly existed between Pica pica and Pica serica in the Amur region of southeast Siberia to eastern Mongolia, but with range expansion in recent decades by both species, this has now filled in; hybrids have been observed where the two now meet, but have low breeding success.

=== Fossil species ===
Two prehistoric species of Pica are currently known: Pica mourerae, from fossils found in Pliocene–Pleistocene boundary strata on Mallorca, and Pica praepica, from Early Pleistocene strata of Bulgaria.
