= 2025 Anguillian general election =

- 26 February 2025

11 of 13 seats in the House of Assembly 7 seats needed for a majority
- Registered: 12,550
- Turnout: 59.99% (▼1.03pp)

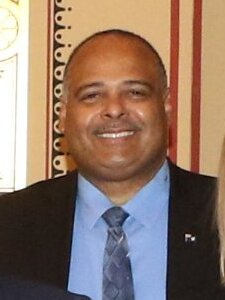
	First party	Second party
Leader	Cora Richardson-Hodge	Ellis Webster
Party	AUF	APM
Leader's seat	Sandy Hill	Island Harbour
Last election	44.11%, 4 seats	51.33%, 7 seats
Seats won	8	3
Seat change	▲4	▼4
Popular vote	3,654	3,543
Percentage	48.92%	47.44%
Swing	▲4.81pp	▼3.89pp
- Results by constituency
Premier before election
Ellis Webster
APM
Elected Premier
Cora Richardson-Hodge
AUF

General elections were held in Anguilla on 26 February 2025. The election resulted in a victory for the opposition Anguilla United Front, with Cora Richardson-Hodge becoming Anguilla's first female premier.

== Electoral system ==
The 13-member House of Assembly consists of seven members elected in single-member constituencies by first-past-the-post voting, four at-large members elected from the entire island by plurality at-large voting and two ex officio members, the Attorney General and Deputy Governor. Voters may vote up to four candidates in the at-large seats. Voters had to be at least 18 years old, whilst candidates had to be at least 21.

A controversial proposal to revoke the voting rights of Anguillians living abroad sparked public backlash. Facing opposition, the plan was ultimately abandoned.

== Campaign ==
Key campaign issues included economic diversification, governance integrity, youth employment, and healthcare. The campaign period featured multiple public debates and rallies. This election cycle has also included the use of social media, with parties leveraging digital outreach to engage younger voters and the wider Anguillian diaspora.

One key issue in the election campaign was the management of Anguilla’s lucrative .ai internet domain, which has gained global significance due to its association with artificial intelligence. The growing demand for .ai domain names, fueled by startups and tech firms seeking AI-related branding, has become a major revenue source for Anguilla, generating about $32 million in 2023 alone.

The ruling Anguilla Progressive Movement (APM), led by Premier Ellis Webster, centered its campaign on its record since taking office in 2020, emphasizing economic stabilization and efforts to strengthen healthcare and education.

The Anguilla United Front (AUF), the main opposition party, criticized the incumbent government’s handling of economic challenges, arguing that the cost of living remains too high and calling for small business support and job creation.

The Anguilla Reliable Team (ART), a new party not present in the last election, campaigned for financial independence, aiming to reduce citizens' reliance on government aid.

=== Party slogans ===
Party	Slogan	Refs
APM	"Yes to Progress"	
AUF	"Putting people first"	
ART	"‘Lead with love"	

=== Contesting parties ===
Party	Position	Ideology	Leader	Last election	Contested
Anguilla Progressive Movement	Centre-left	Liberalism; Progressivism	Ellis Webster	7 / 11 (64%)	11 / 11 (100%)
Anguilla United Front	Centre; Centre-right	Conservative liberalism	Cora Richardson-Hodge	4 / 11 (36%)	11 / 11 (100%)
Anguilla Reliable Team			Curtis Richardson		7 / 11 (64%)

== Results ==
Party	Constituency			At-large			Total seats	+/–
Party	Votes	%	Seats	Votes	%	Seats	Total seats	+/–
Anguilla United Front	3,654	48.92	4	14,613	49.59	4	8	+4
Anguilla Progressive Movement	3,543	47.44	3	12,676	43.02	0	3	–4
Anguilla Reliable Team	117	1.57	0	1,527	5.18	0	0	New
Independents	155	2.08	0	650	2.21	0	0	0
Total	7,469	100.00	7	29,466	100.00	4	11	0
Valid votes	7,258	96.40						
Invalid votes	263	3.49						
Blank votes	8	0.11						
Total votes	7,529	100.00						
Registered voters/turnout	12,550	59.99						
Source: Central Electoral Office, Supervisor of Elections Report

=== By constituency ===
Constituency	Candidate	Party	Votes	%
1 - Island Harbour	Ellis Lorenzo Webster	Anguilla Progressive Movement	573	55.0
1 - Island Harbour	Claude C. Smith	Anguilla United Front	313	30.1
1 - Island Harbour	Palmavon Webster	Independent	115	11.1
1 - Island Harbour	Keith Fabian	Independent	40	3.8
2 - Sandy Hill	Cora Richardson-Hodge	Anguilla United Front	436	58.6
2 - Sandy Hill	Lennox Vanterpool	Anguilla Progressive Movement	308	41.4
3 - Valley North	Shellya Rogers-Webster	Anguilla United Front	919	66.4
3 - Valley North	Courtney Morton	Anguilla Progressive Movement	466	33.6
4 - Valley South	Cordell Richardson	Anguilla United Front	951	55.7
4 - Valley South	Dee-Ann Kentish-Rogers	Anguilla Progressive Movement	756	44.3
5 - Road North	Merrick Richardson	Anguilla Progressive Movement	339	48.7
5 - Road North	Davon C. Carty	Anguilla United Front	306	44.0
5 - Road North	Aristo Richardson	Anguilla Reliable Team	51	7.3
6 - Road South	Haydn Hughes	Anguilla Progressive Movement	792	65.7
6 - Road South	Patrick Mardenborough	Anguilla United Front	351	29.1
6 - Road South	Marie Connor	Anguilla Reliable Team	62	5.2
7 - West End	Cardigan Connor	Anguilla United Front	378	54.7
7 - West End	Jamie D. Hodge	Anguilla Progressive Movement	309	44.7
7 - West End	Kevin Pickering-Meyers	Anguilla Reliable Team	4	0.6
Island Wide (4 seats)	Kyle Hodge	Anguilla United Front	4,002	13.6
Island Wide (4 seats)	José Vanterpool	Anguilla United Front	3,872	13.1
Island Wide (4 seats)	Evans McNiel Rogers	Anguilla United Front	3,377	11.5
Island Wide (4 seats)	Jeison Bryan	Anguilla United Front	3,362	11.4
Island Wide (4 seats)	Quincia Gumbs-Marie	Anguilla Progressive Movement	3,245	11.0
Island Wide (4 seats)	Kenneth Hodge	Anguilla Progressive Movement	3,199	10.9
Island Wide (4 seats)	Glenneva Hodge	Anguilla Progressive Movement	3,146	10.7
Island Wide (4 seats)	Othlyn Vanterpool	Anguilla Progressive Movement	3,086	10.5
Island Wide (4 seats)	Curtis Richardson	Anguilla Reliable Team	780	2.6
Island Wide (4 seats)	Evan Gumbs	Anguilla Reliable Team	401	1.4
Island Wide (4 seats)	Lanny Leo Hobson	Independent	370	1.3
Island Wide (4 seats)	Rommel Hughes	Anguilla Reliable Team	221	0.7
Island Wide (4 seats)	Avenella Griffith	Independent	211	0.7
Island Wide (4 seats)	Marvo Duncan-Webster	Anguilla Reliable Team	125	0.4
Island Wide (4 seats)	Yusuf Abdul Ali	Independent	69	0.2

== Aftermath ==
Following the election, Cora Richardson-Hodge became Anguilla’s first female Premier, a milestone that received widespread praise both locally and regionally. The Anguilla United Front won eight of the eleven contested seats, including all four at-large seats and four district constituencies, defeating the ruling Anguilla Progressive Movement. For the first time in its history, Anguilla is led by an all-female leadership at the highest level, with Richardson-Hodge serving as Premier alongside British-appointed Governor Julia Crouch.

Outgoing Premier Ellis Webster publicly acknowledged the outcome and congratulated Richardson Hodge. In post-election remarks, he encouraged national unity and committed to continuing his service as an opposition representative in the House of Assembly.

In her inaugural address, Premier Richardson-Hodge declared, "The people have spoken and together we have chosen progress, unity and a future that puts people first." She also acknowledged the contributions of outgoing Premier Ellis Webster, the APM candidates, and all others who participated in the democratic process.

According to election observers, the election was assessed as free and fair. Observers praised the orderly conduct of the polls, the professionalism of election officials, and the peaceful environment throughout the process.

=== International reactions ===
- Barbados: Prime Minister Mia Mottley congratulated Richardson-Hodge, describing the election as “a historic moment, not just for our Caribbean brothers and sisters in Anguilla, but for the entire region.” Mottley expressed eagerness to work together and emphasized Anguilla’s importance as an associate member of CARICOM, stating, “As an associate member of CARICOM, Anguilla is an integral part of our regional family.”
- Sint Maarten: Minister of Tourism and Transport Grisha Heyliger-Marten, extended her “heartfelt congratulations” to Richardson-Hodge on her election victory. She stated, “As the island’s first female premier, Cora Richardson Hodge is not only breaking barriers but also paving the way for future generations of leaders.”
- United Kingdom: Minister of State for Europe, North America, and Overseas Territories, Stephen Doughty, expressed his congratulations to Cora Richardson-Hodge and the Anguilla United Front, adding, "I look forward to working with you for the people of Anguilla."

==== Other ====
In Saint Kitts and Nevis, Janice Daniel-Hodge, leader of the Nevis Reformation Party, described Richardson-Hodge’s election as an “incredible and historic victory for the people of Anguilla.” She emphasized that the moment marked not just a political victory, but also a significant milestone in both Anguilla’s history and gender representation. In Jamaica, Mark J. Golding, leader of the People's National Party, congratulated Richardson-Hodge on her victory, calling it a “proud moment” for both Anguilla and the entire Caribbean. He expressed his anticipation for future collaboration.

The Eastern Caribbean Central Bank (ECCB) congratulated Richardson-Hodge on her election as Premier and expressed its anticipation for a "fruitful" relationship with her, as well as with the government and people of Anguilla, in advancing the region's "transformation agenda." The ECCB also acknowledged the service of former Premier Ellis Webster, who had served as a member of the ECCB Council and Chairman.
