= List of political parties in Anguilla =

This article lists political parties in Anguilla.

Anguilla used to be a part of Saint Christopher-Nevis-Anguilla, which hindered the formation of parties on the island. Early parties included the Anguilla Democratic Party (founded by October 1967 during the island's brief and unrecognized independence as the Republic of Anguilla) and the Anguilla Constructive Democratic Movement (founded after The Anguilla (Administration) Order of 1971). Both organizations quickly vanished as they lacked mass appeal. The Anguilla (Constitution) Order of 1976 firmly laid "the foundations for the development of party politics".

The first party to formally take part in elections was the People's Progressive Party led by Ronald Webster, which won 6 out of 7 seats at the 1976 Anguillian general election. Parties that appeared during the 1972–1980 period include the Anguilla Democratic Party (led by Camile Connor as of 1976), the Anguilla National Alliance, and the Anguilla United Movement (founded by Webster). The latter two broke off from the PPP, which ceased to exist, and contested the 1980 Anguillian general election.

The Anguilla United Front alliance, consisting of the Anguilla Democratic Party and the Anguilla National Alliance, was formed in 2000. The Anguilla United Movement became the Anguilla Progressive Movement in 2019.

Due to holding elections under forms of first-past-the-post, Anguilla has a two-party system, which means that there are two dominant political parties, with it being extremely difficult for anybody to achieve electoral success under the banner of any other party.

== The parties ==
=== Represented in the House of Assembly ===
Name	Abbr.	Leader	Ideology	House	Political position
Anguilla United Front	AUF	Cora Richardson-Hodge	Conservative liberalism	8 / 13	Centre to Centre-right
Anguilla Progressive Movement	APM	Ellis Webster	Liberalism; Progressivism	3 / 13	Centre-left

=== Other parties ===
- Anguilla Progressive Party
- Anguilla Strategic Alliance

=== Defunct parties ===
- Anguilla Democratic Party
- Anguilla National Alliance
- People's Progressive Party
- United National Movement (Saint Kitts-Nevis-Anguilla)

== See also ==
- Politics of Anguilla
- List of political parties by country
