= Premier of Anguilla =

Head of government of Anguilla

- Coat of arms of Anguilla

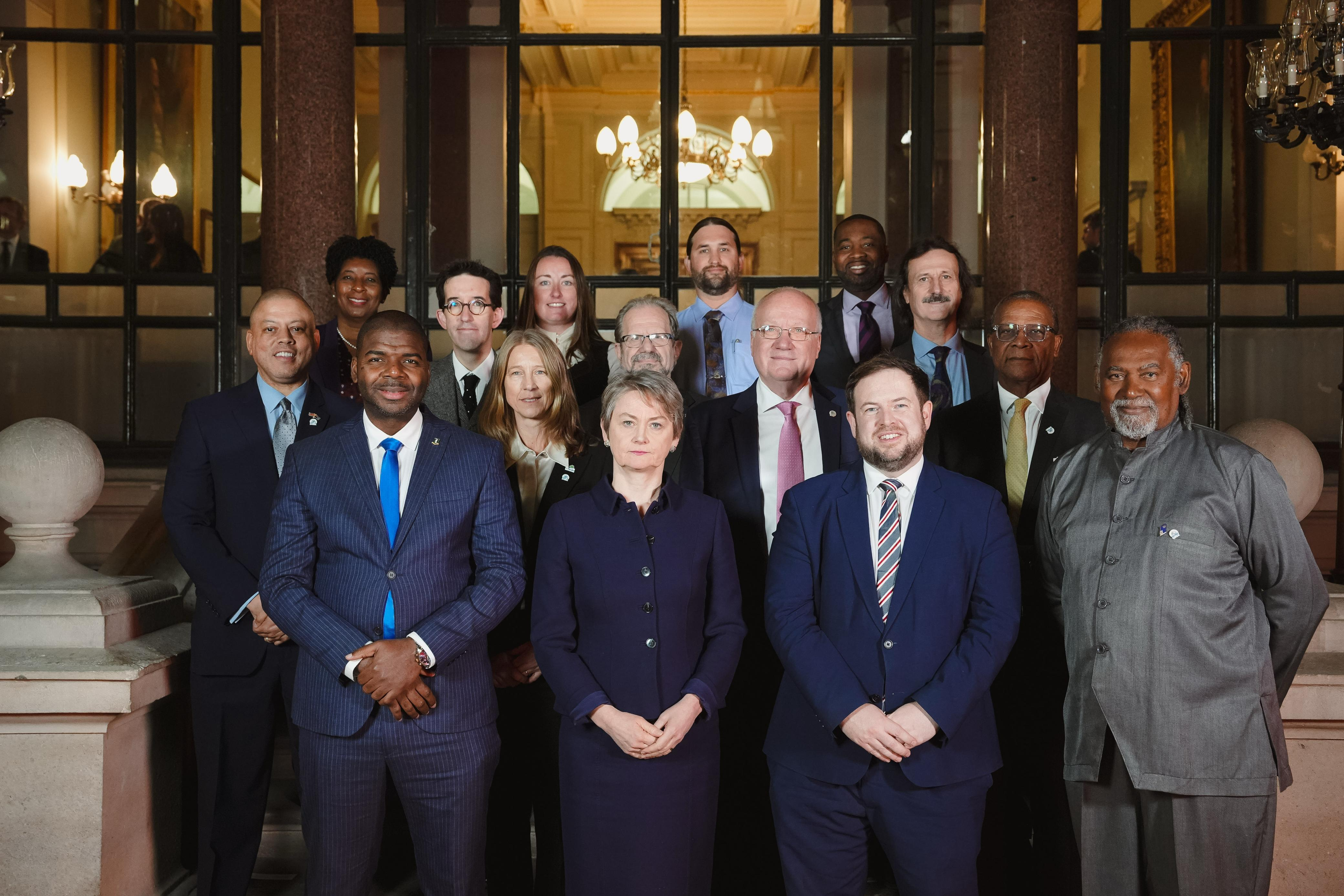
- Incumbent; Cora Richardson-Hodge since 27 February 2025
- Style: The Honourable
- Appointer: Governor of Anguilla
- Term length: At the governor's pleasure
- Formation: 10 February 1976
- First holder: Ronald Webster

The Premier of Anguilla is the head of government in the British Overseas Territory of Anguilla. The Premier is appointed by the Governor of Anguilla on behalf of the monarch of the United Kingdom, and is usually the member of the House of Assembly who commands majority support. The office was previously known as Chief Minister of Anguilla till 2019.

Ronald Webster was the inaugural holder of the position in 1976. Victor Banks was the chief minister when the name change happened in 2019, and was officially the first premier of the territory. Cora Richardson-Hodge is the incumbent since February 2025.

== Overview and appointment ==
The Premier is the head of government in Anguilla, a self-governing British Overseas Territory. The Premier is appointed by the Governor of Anguilla on behalf of the monarch of the United Kingdom. The House of Assembly has 11 seats with seven members elected through direct voting from single-seat constituencies, two nominated members appointed by the governor, attorney general, and deputy governor. The Premier is usually the member of the House of Assembly whose party or coalition commands a simple majority.

== Historical development ==
In 1976, Anguilla adopted a new constitution that introduced a ministerial system of government for the first time. It created the office of Chief Minister, who led an Executive Council and the establishment of the Legislative Assembly. After the 1976 Anguillian general election, Ronald Webster became the first chief minister. Emile Gumbs took over as chief minister in 1977 before Webster returned to power in 1980.

The Anguilla Act 1980 officially separated Anguilla from St Kitts and Nevis, and a constitutional amendment was enacted in 1982, which created the office of the Governor of Anguilla, and renamed the Legislative Assembly as the House of Assembly, while the Governor retained significant powers. Gumbs returned as the Chief Minister in 1984, and served for more than a decade, before Hubert Hughes took over in 1994. Hughes was succeeded by Osbourne Fleming in 2000, who was re-elected for a second term after the 2005 Anguillian general election.

Victor Banks took over as the Chief Minister in April 2015. The Anguilla Constitution (Amendment) Order 2019, which took effect on 14 May 2019, renamed the position of the Chief Minister as Premier. Banks became the first person to officially hold office as the Premier on 14 May 2019. Ellis Webster succeeded him in 2019. In February 2025, Cora Richardson-Hodge became the first female to be appointed Premier of Anguilla.

== List ==
Key: PPP ANA AUP AUF AUM APM

No.	Portrait	Name (Birth–Death)	Term of office (Note: Date in italics indicate de facto continuation of office)			Political party	Elected	Notes
No.	Portrait	Name (Birth–Death)	Took office	Left office	Time in office	Political party	Elected	Notes
Chief Ministers (1976–2019)
1		Ronald Webster (1926–2016)	10 February 1976	1 February 1977	357 days	People's Progressive Party	1976	First tenure
2		Emile Gumbs (1928–2018)	1 February 1977	28 May 1980	3 years, 117 days	Anguilla National Alliance	1976	First tenure
(1)		Ronald Webster (1926–2016)	28 May 1980	12 March 1984	3 years, 289 days	Anguilla United Party	1980	Second tenure
(1)		Ronald Webster (1926–2016)	28 May 1980	12 March 1984	3 years, 289 days	Anguilla National Alliance	1981	Second tenure
(2)		Emile Gumbs (1928–2018)	12 March 1984	16 March 1994	10 years, 4 days	Anguilla National Alliance	1984; 1989	Second tenure
3		Hubert Hughes (1933–2021)	16 March 1994	6 March 2000	5 years, 356 days	Anguilla United Party	1994; 1999	First tenure
4		Osbourne Fleming (born 1940)	6 March 2000	16 February 2010	9 years, 347 days	Anguilla United Front	2000; 2005	
(3)		Hubert Hughes (1933–2021)	16 February 2010	23 April 2015	5 years, 66 days	Anguilla United Movement	2010	Second tenure
5		Victor Banks (born 1947)	23 April 2015	13 May 2019	4 years, 20 days	Anguilla United Front	2015	
Premiers (2019–present)
1		Victor Banks (born 1947)	14 May 2019	30 June 2020	1 year, 47 days	Anguilla United Front	—	
2		Ellis Webster (born 1963)	30 June 2020	27 February 2025	4 years, 242 days	Anguilla Progressive Movement	2020	
3		Cora Richardson-Hodge	27 February 2025	Incumbent	1 year, 192 days	Anguilla United Front	2025	

== See also ==
- List of current heads of government in the United Kingdom and dependencies
- List of leaders of dependent territories
- Elections in Anguilla
- Politics of Anguilla
- List of prime ministers of Saint Kitts and Nevis
- Prime Minister of the West Indies Federation
