= Dee-Ann Kentish-Rogers =

Anguillan politician, model, and athlete

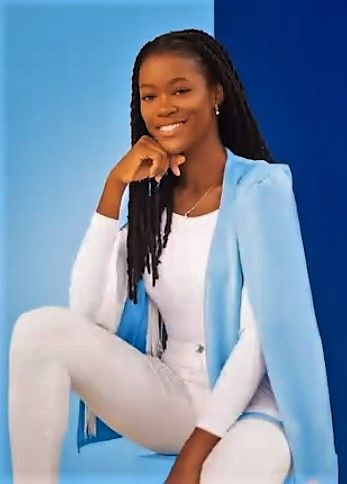
- Kentish-Rogers in 2020

Minister for Education and Social Development
- In office 30 June 2020 – 27 February 2025
- Premier: Ellis Webster
- Succeeded by: Shellya Kenisha Rogers-Webster

Member of the House of Assembly
- In office 30 June 2020 – 27 February 2025
- Preceded by: Victor Banks
- Succeeded by: Cordell Richardson
- Constituency: Valley South

Personal details
- Born: 13 January 1993 (age 33) The Valley, Anguilla
- Party: Anguilla Progressive Movement
- Education: University of Birmingham (LLB)
- Beauty pageant titleholder
- Title: Miss Anguilla 2017; Miss Universe Great Britain 2018
- Major competitions: Miss Universe Great Britain 2018 (Winner); Miss Universe 2018 (Top 20)

Dee-Ann Kentish-Rogers (born 13 January 1993) is an Anguillan politician, lawyer, athlete, former model and beauty pageant titleholder. A member of the Anguilla Progressive Movement, Kentish-Rogers served as the Minister for Education and Social Development in the government of Ellis Webster from 2020 until 2025. She also represented the constituency of Valley South in the House of Assembly from 2020 until 2025. Kentish-Rogers lost reelection in the 2025 Anguillian general election, when the Anguilla United Front took control of the government. Since 2021, she has been a Millennium Fellow at the Atlantic Council in Washington, D.C.

Kentish-Rogers first received national recognition in athletics, competing for Anguilla at the 2010 and 2014 Commonwealth Games, and at the 2012 CARIFTA Games. She afterwards became a model and beauty pageant titleholder, winning Miss Anguilla 2017 and Miss Universe Great Britain 2018, where she was the second Black British woman after Anita St. Rose in 1996 to win the title. Kentish-Rogers later went on to place in the Top 20 at Miss Universe 2018 as the British representative.

== Early life, athletics, and education ==
Kentish-Rogers was born on 13 January 1993 in The Valley on the island of Anguilla, a British Overseas Territory in the Caribbean, and was raised on her family farm. Growing up, Kentish-Rogers resided in a house with 11 other family members, including several male cousins, and was a self-described "tomboy" who played football. Kentish-Rogers later began competing in athletics, beginning with the 400 metres and later switching to heptathlon. As an athlete, Kentish-Rogers represented Anguilla at the 2010 and 2014 Commonwealth Games, and at the 2012 CARIFTA Games, with the ultimate goal of joining Team GB at the 2016 Summer Olympics. While competing at the 2014 Commonwealth Games, she suffered a knee injury which put an end to her athletics career.

Kentish-Rogers subsequently relocated to Birmingham in England to enroll in the University of Birmingham as a law student. She graduated with a Bachelor of Laws degree and qualified as a barrister in 2018.

== Pageantry ==
Kentish-Rogers began her pageantry career in 2017, after she won Miss Anguilla 2017. Following her return to Birmingham the following year, Kentish-Rogers registered as a contestant at Miss Universe Great Britain 2018; she was eligible for the pageant due to her residence in Birmingham, as eligibility is reserved for British citizens resident in only England, Scotland, or Wales. The pageant was held on 14 July 2018 in Newport, Wales, and Kentish-Rogers went on to be declared the winner. She was the first Black British woman to win the title.

As Miss Universe Great Britain, Kentish-Rogers received the right to represent Great Britain at Miss Universe 2018. The pageant was held on 17 December 2018 in Bangkok, where she reached the top 20.

== Political career ==
Kentish-Rogers began a political career in 2020, after announcing her candidacy on behalf of the Anguilla Progressive Movement (APM) in the 2020 general election. Kentish-Rogers was selected to contest the Valley South constituency for the Anguilla House of Assembly, standing against incumbent premier Victor Banks. The election was held on 29 June 2020, where Kentish-Rogers was elected to the Anguillan parliament. She received the highest number of votes of any constituency candidate standing in the election, and additionally became the youngest person elected to the House of Assembly, aged 27.

Following the certification of election results, the APM were determined to have won the election, securing a majority in the House of Assembly. Party leader Ellis Webster later took office as premier and formed a seven-person government, nominating Kentish-Rogers to serve as education and social development minister. In February 2022, Kentish-Rogers served as acting premier for ten days, while Webster was not present in Anguilla; aged 29, she became the youngest person to serve in the position in Anguillan history. In June 2023, Kentish-Rogers resigned from the government and from the APM in protest of the government's handling of the implementation of the goods and service tax (GST), but was reappointed one week later.

Kentish-Rogers stood for reelection in the 2025 general election, but was defeated in her constituency by Cordell Richardson of the Anguilla United Front (AUF). The AUF flipped four seats in the House of Assembly which were held by the APM, and took control of the government, led by Cora Richardson-Hodge. Kentish-Rogers's also resigned as education and social development minister, and was succeeded by Shellya Kenisha Rogers-Webster of the AUF, under the title of social development minister.

== Personal life ==
As of 2020, Kentish-Rogers continued to reside in the family home where she was raised in The Valley. While reigning as Miss Universe Great Britain, Kentish-Rogers split her time between Anguilla and Birmingham.

Awards and achievements
Preceded by Anna Burdzy	Miss Universe Great Britain; 2018	Succeeded by Emma Jenkins
