= West End (Anguilla House of Assembly Constituency) =

Constituency of the Anguilla House of Assembly

West End is a constituency of the Anguillan House of Assembly. The incumbent, elected in the 2020 Anguillian general election is Cardigan Connor of the Anguilla United Front.

== Representatives ==
| Election | Member | Party |
|---|---|---|
| 1989 | Albert E. Hughes | AUP |
| 1994 | Albert E. Hughes | AUP |
| 1999 | Albert E. Hughes | AUP |
| 2000 | Albert E. Hughes | AUM |
| 2005 | Albert E. Hughes | ANSA |
| 2010 | Walcott Richardson | AUM |
| 2015 | Cardigan Connor | AUF |
| 2020 | Cardigan Connor | AUF |

== Election results ==
=== Elections in the 2020s ===
General Election 2020: West End
| Party | Candidate | Votes | % | ±% |
|---|---|---|---|---|
| AUF | Cardigan Connor | 286 | 46.1 | -9.3 |
| APM | Kimberley Fleming | 263 | 42.4 | N/A |
| Independent | Jamie Hodge | 72 | 11.6 | N/A |
| Majority | | 23 | 3.7 | |
| Turnout | | 621 | | |
| AUF hold | | Swing | N/A | |

=== Elections in the 2010s ===
General Election 2015: West End
| Party | Candidate | Votes | % | ±% |
|---|---|---|---|---|
| AUF | Cardigan Connor | 389 | 55.4 | N/A |
| AUM | Kristy Richardson | 313 | 44.6 | N/A |
| Majority | | 76 | 10.8 | − |
| Turnout | | 702 | | |
| AUF gain from AUM | | Swing | N/A | |

General Election 2010: West End
| Party | Candidate | Votes | % | ±% |
|---|---|---|---|---|
| AUM | Walcott Richardson | 313 | 46.4 | +13.8 |
| APP | Wilmoth Hodge | 183 | 27.2 | −2.6 |
| AUF | Kenswick Richardson | 178 | 26.4 | N/A |
| Majority | | 130 | 19.3 | − |
| Turnout | | 674 | | |
| AUM gain from ANSA | | Swing | N/A | |

=== Elections in the 2000s ===
General Election 2005: West End
| Party | Candidate | Votes | % | ±% |
|---|---|---|---|---|
| ANSA | Albert E. Hughes | 160 | 37.6 | N/A |
| AUM | Walcott Richardson | 139 | 32.6 | −26.8 |
| APP | Wilmoth Hodge | 127 | 29.8 | N/A |
| Majority | | 21 | 4.9 | |
| Turnout | | 426 | | |
| ANSA gain from AUM | | Swing | N/A | |

General Election 2000: West End
| Party | Candidate | Votes | % | ±% |
|---|---|---|---|---|
| AUM | Albert E. Hughes | 218 | 59.4 | N/A |
| ANA | Kenswick Richardson | 149 | 40.6 | +5.5 |
| Majority | | 69 | 18.8 | |
| Turnout | | 367 | | |
| AUM hold | | Swing | N/A | |

=== Elections in the 1990s ===
General Election 1999: West End
| Party | Candidate | Votes | % | ±% |
|---|---|---|---|---|
| AUP | Albert E. Hughes | 270 | 64.9 | +3.1 |
| ANA | Kenswick Richardson | 146 | 35.1 | N/A |
| Majority | | 124 | 29.8 | |
| Turnout | | 416 | | |
| AUP hold | | Swing | N/A | |

General Election 1994: West End
| Party | Candidate | Votes | % | ±% |
|---|---|---|---|---|
| AUP | Albert E. Hughes | 186 | 61.8 | +13.7 |
| ADP | Kenswick Richardson | 115 | 38.2 | +14.5 |
| Majority | | 71 | 23.6 | |
| Turnout | | 301 | | |
| AUP hold | | Swing | | |

=== Elections in the 1980s ===
General Election 1989: West End
| Party | Candidate | Votes | % | ±% |
|---|---|---|---|---|
| AUP | Albert E. Hughes | 128 | 48.1 | |
| Anguilla for Good Governance | Omah C. Richardson | 75 | 28.1 | |
| ADP | Kenswick Richardson | 63 | 23.7 | |
| Majority | | 53 | 19.9 | |
| Turnout | | 266 | | |
