= Island Harbour (Anguilla House of Assembly Constituency) =

Island Harbour is a constituency of the Anguillan House of Assembly. The incumbent is Premier-elect Ellis Lorenzo Webster.

== Representatives ==
Island Harbour has been a relatively safe seat for the ANA/AUF since inception - the party has held it since 1989.

Election	Member	Party
1989	Kenneth Harrigan	ANA
1994	Kenneth Harrigan	ANA
1999	Kenneth Harrigan	ANA
2000	Kenneth Harrigan	ANA
2005	Kenneth Harrigan	AUF
2010	Othlyn Vanterpool	AUF
2015	Palmavon Webster	IND
2020	Ellis Lorenzo Webster	APM

== Election results ==
=== Elections in the 2020s ===
2020 Anguillan general election: Island Harbour
Party	Candidate	Votes	%	±%
APM	Ellis Lorenzo Webster	493	49.5	+18.0
AUF	Oris Smith	336	33.7	+0.5
Independent	Palmavon Webster	167	16.8	−18.4
Majority		157	15.8	
Turnout		996		
APM gain from Independent		Swing	N/A	

=== Elections in the 2010s ===
General Election 2015: Island Harbour
Party	Candidate	Votes	%	±%
Independent	Palmavon Webster	460	35.2	+13.4
AUF	Othlyn Vanterpool	434	33.2	−0.9
AUM	Ellis Lorenzo Webster	412	31.5	+12.4
Majority		26	2.0	
Turnout		1,306		
Independent gain from AUF		Swing	N/A	

General Election 2010: Island Harbour
Party	Candidate	Votes	%	±%
AUF	Othlyn Vanterpool	383	34.1	−25.5
APP	Palmavon Webster	245	21.8	N/A
Independent	Terry Harrigan	236	21.0	N/A
AUM	Samuel Webster	215	19.1	N/A
Independent	Kennedy Hodge	45	4.0	N/A
Majority		138	12.3	−25.6
Turnout		1,124		
AUF hold		Swing	N/A	

=== Elections in the 2000s ===
General Election 2005: Island Harbour
Party	Candidate	Votes	%	±%
AUF	Kenneth Harrigan	459	59.6	−0.8
Independent	Joshua Hodge	167	21.7	N/A
Independent	Barbara J. Webster-Bourne	102	13.2	−13.8
Independent	Londrade Hodge	42	5.4	N/A
Majority		292	37.9	+4.5
Turnout		770		
AUF hold		Swing	+6.5	

General Election 2000: Island Harbour
Party	Candidate	Votes	%	±%
ANA	Kenneth Harrigan	495	60.4	+0.5
Independent	Barbara J. Webster-Bourne	221	27.0	−0.9
APM	Franklin Richardson	104	12.7	+0.5
Majority		274	33.4	+1.4
Turnout		820		
ANA hold		Swing	+0.7	

=== Elections in the 1990s ===
General Election 1999: Island Harbour
Party	Candidate	Votes	%	±%
ANA	Kenneth Harrigan	483	59.9	+4.3
ADP	Barbara J. Webster-Bourne	225	27.9	N/A
Independent	Franklin Richardson	98	12.2	N/A
Majority		258	32.0	+16.0
Turnout		806		
ANA hold		Swing	N/A	

General Election 1994: Island Harbour
Party	Candidate	Votes	%	±%
ANA	Kenneth Harrigan	438	55.6	−0.6
Anguilla for Good Government	Londrane Hodge	328	41.6	N/A
Independent	Cuthwin Webster	22	2.8	N/A
Majority		110	14.0	+1.7
Turnout		788		
ANA hold		Swing	N/A	

=== Elections in the 1980s ===
General Election 1989: Island Harbour
Party	Candidate	Votes	%	±%
ANA	Kenneth Harrigan	389	56.1	
AUP	Ronald Webster	304	43.9	
Majority		85	12.3	
Turnout		693		
ANA hold		Swing		
