= Road South (Anguilla House of Assembly Constituency) =

Road South is a constituency of the Anguillan House of Assembly. The representative is Haydn Hughes of the Anguilla Progressive Movement.

== Representatives ==
| Election | Member | Party |
|---|---|---|
| 1989 | Hubert B. Hughes | AUP |
| 1994 | Hubert B. Hughes | AUP |
| 1999 | Hubert B. Hughes | AUP |
| 2000 | Hubert B. Hughes | AUM |
| 2005 | Hubert B. Hughes | AUM |
| 2010 | Hubert B. Hughes | AUM |
| 2015 | Curtis Richardson | AUF |
| 2020 | Haydn Hughes | APM |

== Election results ==
=== Elections in the 2020s ===
2020 Anguillian general election: Road South
| Party | Candidate | Votes | % | ±% |
|---|---|---|---|---|
| APM | Haydn Hughes | 727 | 57.4 | +11.4 |
| AUF | Curtis Richardson | 540 | 42.6 | -8.7 |
| Majority | | 187 | 14.8 | |
| Turnout | | 1,267 | | |
| APM gain from AUF | | Swing | N/A | |

=== Elections in the 2010s ===
General Election 2015: Road South
| Party | Candidate | Votes | % | ±% |
|---|---|---|---|---|
| AUF | Curtis Richardson | 641 | 51.3 | +19.7 |
| AUM | Haydn Hughes | 575 | 46.0 | N/A |
| Dove Party | Clifton Niles | 24 | 1.9 | N/A |
| ANA | Statchel Warner | 10 | 0.8 | N/A |
| Majority | | 66 | 5.3 | |
| Turnout | | 1,250 | | |
| AUF gain from AUM | | Swing | N/A | |

General Election 2010: Road South
| Party | Candidate | Votes | % | ±% |
|---|---|---|---|---|
| AUM | Hubert B. Hughes | 504 | 45.3 | +0.8 |
| AUF | Curtis Richardson | 352 | 31.6 | N/A |
| APP | Brent Davis | 257 | 23.1 | −2.5 |
| Majority | | 152 | 13.7 | |
| Turnout | | 1,113 | | |
| AUM hold | | Swing | N/A | |

=== Elections in the 2000s ===
General Election 2005: Road South
| Party | Candidate | Votes | % | ±% |
|---|---|---|---|---|
| AUM | Hubert B. Hughes | 420 | 44.5 | −10.6 |
| APP | Brent Davis | 241 | 25.6 | N/A |
| ANSA | Curtis Richardson | 224 | 23.8 | N/A |
| Independent | Jere A. Gumbs | 58 | 6.2 | N/A |
| Majority | | 179 | 19.0 | |
| Turnout | | 943 | | |
| AUM hold | | Swing | N/A | |

General Election 2000: Road South
| Party | Candidate | Votes | % | ±% |
|---|---|---|---|---|
| AUM | Hubert B. Hughes | 378 | 55.1 | −10.1 |
| Independent | Franklin Connor | 308 | 44.9 | +10.1 |
| Majority | | 70 | 10.2 | |
| Turnout | | 686 | | |
| AUM hold | | Swing | -10.1 | |

=== Elections in the 1990s ===
General Election 1999: Road South
| Party | Candidate | Votes | % | ±% |
|---|---|---|---|---|
| AUP | Hubert B. Hughes | 434 | 65.2 | +17.7 |
| Independent | Franklin Connor | 232 | 34.8 | N/A |
| Majority | | 202 | 30.3 | |
| Turnout | | 666 | | |
| AUP hold | | Swing | N/A | |

General Election 1994: Road South
| Party | Candidate | Votes | % | ±% |
|---|---|---|---|---|
| AUP | Hubert B. Hughes | 308 | 47.5 | −6.6 |
| ANA | Everet Romney | 165 | 25.5 | −2.6 |
| ADP | Samuel Connor | 112 | 17.3 | +8.1 |
| Independent | Alan Gumbs | 63 | 9.7 | N/A |
| Majority | | 143 | 22.1 | |
| Turnout | | 648 | | |
| AUP hold | | Swing | -2.0 | |

=== Elections in the 1980s ===
General Election 1989: Road South
| Party | Candidate | Votes | % | ±% |
|---|---|---|---|---|
| AUP | Hubert B. Hughes | 289 | 54.1 | |
| ANA | Statchel F. Warner | 150 | 28.1 | |
| ADP | Maurice Connor | 49 | 9.2 | |
| Independent | Lolita Davis-Ifille, | 46 | 8.6 | |
| Majority | | 139 | 26.0 | |
| Turnout | | 534 | | |
