= Palmavon Webster =

Anguillian lawyer and politician

Member of the House of Assembly of Anguilla
- In office 23 April 2015 – 30 June 2020
- Constituency: Island Harbour

Palmavon Webster is an Anguillian lawyer and politician. She is a former member of the House of Assembly of Anguilla and leader of the opposition.

Webster was born in Island Harbour, Anguilla. She went to the University of the West Indies at Cave Hill in Barbados, graduating with a bachelor's in law in 1984. She obtained a legal education certificate from the Norman Manley Law School in Jamaica in 1986.

From 1986 to 1987, she worked as crown counsel to the attorney general of Anguilla. Since then, she has worked as a lawyer focused on corporate and real estate law at her Webster Law Firm. She was also a long-serving president of the Anguilla Financial Services Association beginning in 2001.

Webster first entered politics in 2010, running for the Island Harbour seat in the House of Assembly as a member of the Anguilla Progressive Party. She lost to Othlyn Vanterpool of the Anguilla United Front.

Five years later, after distancing herself from the APP—saying that "our values have separated"—she ran as an independent. She took the seat in the 2015 Anguillian general election, unseating the incumbent with 35% of the vote to his 33%. The only member elected who was not in the AUF, she subsequently became leader of the opposition.

Alongside Cora Richardson-Hodge and Evalie Bradley, she was part of a wave of female candidates who took office in the House of Assembly that year, the first women to do so in over three decades. Webster herself was the first female representative of her district and the country's first female leader of the opposition.

In 2018, she was elected to the board of the Caribbean Democrat Union, a centre-right political union.

She ran for re-election to the House of Assembly in 2020 but lost to the leader of the Anguilla Progressive Movement, Ellis Webster, who became premier. She attempted to unseat Ellis Webster in 2025, running as an independent, but did not win.
