= 2020 Anguillian general election =

- 29 June 2020

11 of the 13 seats in the House of Assembly 7 seats needed for a majority
- Registered: 11,951
- Turnout: 61.02% (▼12.22pp)
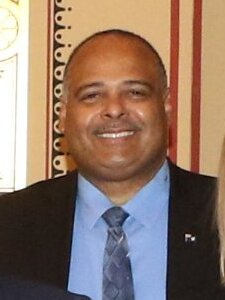

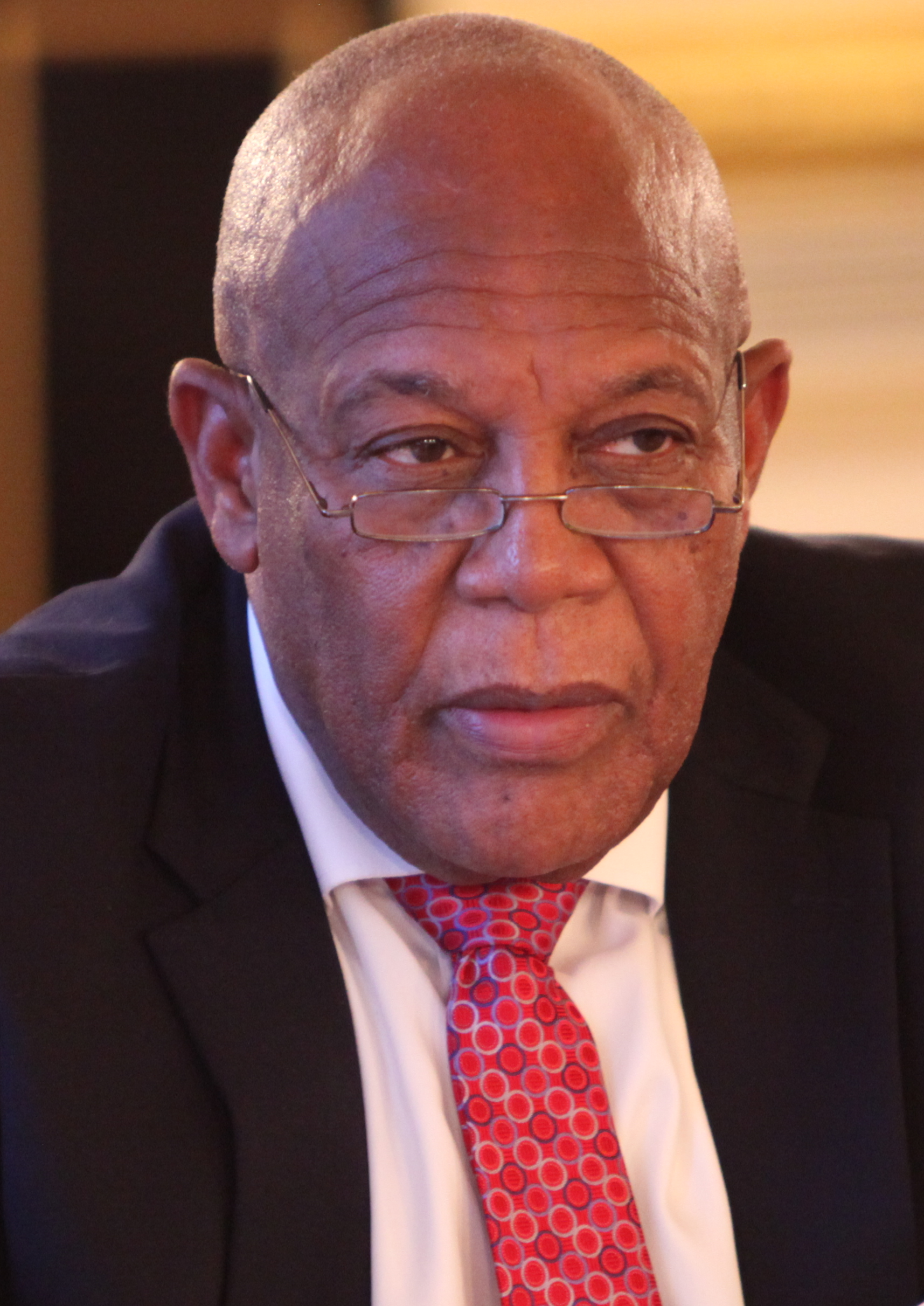
	First party	Second party
Leader	Ellis Webster	Victor Banks
Party	APM	AUF
Leader's seat	Island Harbour	Valley South
Last election	38.26%, 0 seats	54.44%, 6 seats
Seats won	7	4
Seat change	▲7	▼2
Popular vote	3,689	3,170
Percentage	51.33%	44.11%
Swing	▲13.07pp	▼10.33pp
- Results by district
Premier before election
Victor Banks
AUF
Elected Premier
Ellis Webster
APM

General elections were held in Anguilla on 29 June 2020. Due to the COVID-19 pandemic, an Order in Council was made to allow the elections to be postponed until 11 September at the latest. However it was not invoked.

== Electoral system ==
The 13-member House of Assembly consists of seven members elected in single-member constituencies by first-past-the-post voting, four at-large members elected from the entire island by plurality at-large voting and two ex officio members. Voters may vote up to four candidates in the at-large seats, which replaced two appointees. Voters must be at least 18 years old, whilst candidates must be at least 21.

== Endorsements ==
For Dee-Ann Kentish-Rogers (Anguilla Progressive Movement candidate in Valley South):

- Celine Willers, Miss Universe Germany 2018
- Caitlin Tyson, Miss Universe Cayman Islands 2018
- Aniska Tonge, Miss Universe US Virgin Islands 2018
- Anna Burdzy, Miss Universe Great Britain 2017
- Selma Kamanya, Miss Universe Zambia 2018
- Aldy Bernard, Miss Universe Dominican Republic 2018

For Haydn Hughes (Anguilla Progressive Movement candidate in Road South):

- Charlamagne tha God, American radio and TV personality

== Campaign ==
The ruling Anguilla United Front (which won six of the seven elected seats in 2015) nominated a full slate of eleven candidates in November 2019. The opposition Anguilla Progressive Movement also nominated eleven candidates in December 2019.

== Results ==
Party	Constituency			At-large			Total seats	+/–
Party	Votes	%	Seats	Votes	%	Seats	Total seats	+/–
Anguilla Progressive Movement	3,689	51.33	4	11,971	42.80	3	7	+7
Anguilla United Front	3,170	44.11	3	9,820	35.11	1	4	−2
Independents	328	4.56	0	6,181	22.10	0	0	−1
Ex offico members							2	0
Total	7,187	100.00	7	27,972	100.00	4	13	0
Valid votes	7,187	98.55						
Invalid/blank votes	106	1.45						
Total votes	7,293	100.00						
Registered voters/turnout	11,951	61.02						
Source: Central Electoral Office, Central Electoral Office

=== By constituency ===
Constituency	Candidate	Party	Votes
1 - Island Harbour	Ellis Webster	Anguilla Progressive Movement	493
1 - Island Harbour	Oris Smith	Anguilla United Front	336
1 - Island Harbour	Palmavon Webster	Independent	167
2 - Sandy Hill	Cora Richardson-Hodge	Anguilla United Front	318
2 - Sandy Hill	Jerome Roberts	Anguilla Progressive Movement	302
3 - Valley North	Evans McNiel Rogers	Anguilla United Front	697
3 - Valley North	Courtney Morton	Anguilla Progressive Movement	657
4 - Valley South	Dee-Ann Kentish-Rogers	Anguilla Progressive Movement	861
4 - Valley South	Victor Banks	Anguilla United Front	755
5 - Road North	Merrick Richardson	Anguilla Progressive Movement	386
5 - Road North	Evalie Bradley	Anguilla United Front	238
5 - Road North	Rommel Hughes	Independent	89
6 - Road South	Haydn Hughes	Anguilla Progressive Movement	727
6 - Road South	Curtis Richardson	Anguilla United Front	540
7 - West End	Cardigan Connor	Anguilla United Front	286
7 - West End	Kimberley Fleming	Anguilla Progressive Movement	263
7 - West End	Jamie Hodge	Independent	72
Island Wide (4 seats)	Kyle Hodge	Anguilla Progressive Movement	3,557
Island Wide (4 seats)	Jose Vanterpool	Anguilla United Front	2,983
Island Wide (4 seats)	Kenneth Hodge	Anguilla Progressive Movement	2,917
Island Wide (4 seats)	Quincia Gumbs-Marie	Anguilla Progressive Movement	2,840
Island Wide (4 seats)	Kennedy Hodge	Anguilla Progressive Movement	2,657
Island Wide (4 seats)	Othlyn Vanterpool	Anguilla United Front	2,420
Island Wide (4 seats)	Lockhart Hughes	Anguilla United Front	2,290
Island Wide (4 seats)	Mark Romney	Anguilla United Front	2,126
Island Wide (4 seats)	Lanny Hobson	Independent	1,643
Island Wide (4 seats)	Aunika Lake	Independent	1,532
Island Wide (4 seats)	Brent Davis	Independent	1,117
Island Wide (4 seats)	Sutcliffe Hodge	Independent	1,016
Island Wide (4 seats)	Glenneva Hodge	Independent	609
Island Wide (4 seats)	Elkin Richardson	Independent	148
Island Wide (4 seats)	Merlyn Duncan	Independent	101
