= 2010 Anguillian general election =

General elections were held in Anguilla on 15 February 2010. Seven seats in the House of Assembly were contested in the election.

The incumbent Chief Minister of Anguilla Osbourne Fleming chose to retire and not stand for election. Fleming was a member of the Anguilla National Alliance, which is part of the ruling Anguilla United Front (AUF), a conservative coalition that won four of the seven seats in the Assembly in the 2005 elections.

The incumbent AUF was defeated, and former Chief Minister Hubert Hughes was sworn in to succeed Fleming as chief minister.

== Background ==
In 2009, Chief Minister Osbourne Fleming, who was also the leader of the Anguilla United Front (AUF), announced that he would not stand for re-election in the 2010 race. Two other members of the ruling AUF also announced their intent to retire as well – Parliamentary Secretary Albert Hughes and Communications and Works Minister Kenneth Harrigan. Collectively, Fleming, Hughes and Harrigan had been active in Anguillan politics for more than 80 years. It was announced that Finance Minister Victor Banks would succeed Fleming as the party leader of the AUF coalition.

According to the Constitution of Anguilla, the general election was due to be held by March 2010. However, the election could have been postponed until as late as May or June 2010.

On Monday, 4 January 2010, the last day of the current Assembly, the leader of government business held talks with the Governor of Anguilla, Alistair Harrison, concerning the dissolution of the legislative body to pave the way for new elections. That same day, Chief Minister Fleming told the Assembly that he felt that the previous five years of AUF in Anguilla had been a success, "The people elected us for five years and five years it would be, that was my commitment that was my pledge."

Retiring Chief Minister Osbourne Fleming officially set 15 February 2010, as the date for the election during a public meeting of the ruling Anguilla United Front (AUF) in Blowing Point held on 5 January 2010. In his announcement, Fleming told supporters, "Tonight, I take great pleasure in advising you that by the help of God, because we don't know what could happen, elections in Anguilla will be on the 15th of February 2010."

Colville Petty, the supervisor of elections, reported that 8,652 voters were registered to vote in the seven electoral districts on the island. That marked an increase in voter registration from the 2005 general election, when 7,558 people registered to vote. Electoral District Four, which includes parts of The Valley, the capital of Anguilla, had the largest number of registered voters in the 2010 election, with a total of 1,789.

== Candidates ==
Twenty candidates registered to contest the seven Assembly seats in the election. The nomination papers for all candidates were due on Thursday, 21 January 2010.

- The Anguilla United Front, the ruling coalition which controlled the majority of the seven seats in the Assembly since the 2005 election, fielded candidates in all seven constituencies. The AUF was the only political party which had a candidate in all seven races. The AUF will be led by Finance Minister Victor Banks, who replaced the retiring Osbourne Fleming as leader of the party.
- The opposition Anguilla United Movement contested five constituencies. The party was headed by former Chief Minister Hubert Hughes.
- The opposition Anguilla Progressive Party also had candidates in five of the seven races. The APP was headed by Brent Davis, an Anguillan businessman.
- Three independents also ran as candidates for seats in the Assembly.

== Results ==
Party	Votes	%	Seats	+/–
Anguilla United Front	2,781	39.37	2	–2
Anguilla United Movement	2,308	32.68	4	+3
Anguilla Progressive Party	1,039	14.71	1	+1
Independents	935	13.24	0	0
Appointed members			4	0
Total	7,063	100.00	11	0
Valid votes	7,063	99.45		
Invalid/blank votes	39	0.55		
Total votes	7,102	100.00		
Registered voters/turnout	8,654	82.07		
Source: Anguilla Elections, Caribbean Elections

=== By constituency ===
Constituency	Candidate	Party	Votes	%
1 - Island Harbour	Othlyn Vanterpool	Anguilla United Front	383	34.07
1 - Island Harbour	Palmavon Webster	Anguilla Progressive Party	245	21.80
1 - Island Harbour	Terry Harrigan	Independent	236	21.00
1 - Island Harbour	Samuel Webster	Anguilla United Movement	215	19.13
1 - Island Harbour	Kennedy Hodge	Independent	45	4.00
2 - Sandy Hill	Jerome Roberts	Anguilla Progressive Party	317	53.46
2 - Sandy Hill	Cora Richardson-Hodge	Anguilla United Front	276	46.54
3 - Valley North	Evans Rogers	Anguilla United Front	679	50.94
3 - Valley North	Sutcliffe Hodge	Independent	654	49.06
4 - Valley South	Evan Gumbs	Anguilla United Movement	788	53.79
4 - Valley South	Victor Banks	Anguilla United Front	677	46.21
5 - Road North	Edison Baird	Anguilla United Movement	488	64.13
5 - Road North	Delsic Rey	Anguilla United Front	236	31.01
5 - Road North	Fabian Lewis	Anguilla Progressive Party	37	4.86
6 - Road South	Hubert Hughes	Anguilla United Movement	504	45.28
6 - Road South	Curtis Richardson	Anguilla United Front	352	31.63
6 - Road South	Brent Davis	Anguilla Progressive Party	257	23.09
7 - West End	Walcott Richardson	Anguilla United Movement	313	46.44
7 - West End	Wilmoth Hodge	Anguilla Progressive Party	183	27.15
7 - West End	Kenswick Richardson	Anguilla United Front	178	26.41
