= Sandy Hill (Anguilla House of Assembly Constituency) =

Sandy Hill is a constituency of the Anguillan House of Assembly. The incumbent is Cora Richardson-Hodge of the Anguilla United Front.

== Representatives ==
From 2000 to 2010, the seat was held by Osbourne Fleming as Chief Minister of Anguilla.

Election	Member	Party
1989	Osbourne Fleming	Independent
1994	Osbourne Fleming	Independent
1999	Osbourne Fleming	ANA
2000	Osbourne Fleming	ANA
2005	Osbourne Fleming	AUF
2010	Jerome Roberts	APP
2015	Cora Richardson-Hodge	AUF
2020	Cora Richardson-Hodge	AUF

== Election results ==
=== Elections in the 2020s ===
2020 Anguillan general election: Sandy Hill
Party	Candidate	Votes	%	±%
AUF	Cora Richardson-Hodge	318	51.3	-9.7
APM	Jerome Roberts	302	48.7	+9.7
Majority		16	2.6	
Turnout		620		
AUF hold		Swing	N/A	

=== Elections in the 2010s ===
General Election 2015: Sandy Hill
Party	Candidate	Votes	%	±%
AUF	Cora Richardson-Hodge	461	61.0	+14.5
AUM	Jerome Roberts	295	39.0	−14.5
Majority		166	22.0	
Turnout		756		
AUF gain from APP		Swing	N/A	

General Election 2010: Sandy Hill
Party	Candidate	Votes	%	±%
APP	Jerome Roberts	317	53.5	+29.7
AUF	Cora Richardson-Hodge	276	46.5	−22.3
Majority		41	6.9	
Turnout		593		
APP gain from AUF		Swing	+26.0	

=== Elections in the 2000s ===
General Election 2005: Sandy Hill
Party	Candidate	Votes	%	±%
AUF	Osbourne Fleming	309	68.8	−3.0
APP	Jerome Roberts	107	23.8	N/A
AUM	George C. Hodge	33	7.3	N/A
Majority		202	45.0	−8.3
Turnout		449		
AUF hold		Swing	N/A	

General Election 2000: Sandy Hill
Party	Candidate	Votes	%	±%
ANA	Osbourne Fleming	349	71.8	−10.3
APM	Quincy Gumbs	90	18.5	N/A
Independent	Margaret Augustus	47	9.7	N/A
Majority		259	53.3	−10.9
Turnout		486		
ANA hold		Swing	N/A	

=== Elections in the 1990s ===
General Election 1999: Sandy Hill
Party	Candidate	Votes	%	±%
ANA	Osbourne Fleming	303	82.1	+25.5
Independent	Clement Ruan	66	17.9	N/A
Majority		237	64.2	+51.1
Turnout		369		
ANA hold		Swing	N/A	

General Election 1994: Sandy Hill
Party	Candidate	Votes	%	±%
Independent	Osbourne Fleming	250	56.6	−10.9
Anguilla for Good Government	Ronald Webster	192	43.4	N/A
Majority		58	13.1	−21.9
Turnout		442		
Independent hold		Swing	N/A	

=== Elections in the 1980s ===
General Election 1989: Sandy Hill
Party	Candidate	Votes	%	±%
Independent	Osbourne Fleming	212	67.5	
AUP	George C. Hodge	102	32.5	
Majority		110	35.0	
Turnout		314		
Independent hold		Swing		
