= Road North (Anguilla House of Assembly Constituency) =

Road North is a constituency of the Anguillan House of Assembly. The incumbent is Merrick Richardson of the Anguilla Progressive Movement.

== Representatives ==
Election	Member	Party
1989	Evan Gumbs	ANA
1994	Edison Baird	ADP
1999	Edison Baird	ADP
2000	Edison Baird	Independent
2005	Edison Baird	ANSA
2010	Edison Baird	AUM
2015	Evalie Bradley	AUF
2020	Merrick Richardson	APM

== Election results ==
=== Elections in the 2020s ===
2020 Anguillan general election: Road North
Party	Candidate	Votes	%	±%
APM	Merrick Richardson	386	54.1	N/A
AUF	Evalie Bradley	238	33.4	-16.7
Independent	Rommel Hughes	89	12.5	N/A
Majority		148	20.7	
Turnout		713		
APM gain from AUF		Swing	N/A	

=== Elections in the 2010s ===
General Election 2015: Road North
Party	Candidate	Votes	%	±%
AUF	Evalie Bradley	394	50.1	+19.1
AUM	Patrick Hanley	393	49.9	−14.2
Majority		1	0.2	
Turnout		787		
AUF gain from AUM		Swing	N/A	

General Election 2010: Road North
Party	Candidate	Votes	%	±%
AUM	Edison Baird	488	64.1	+45.0
AUF	Delsic Ray	236	31.0	−3.0
APP	Fabian Lewis	37	4.9	+2.0
Majority		252	33.1	
Turnout		761		
AUM hold		Swing	N/A	

=== Elections in the 2000s ===
General Election 2005: Road North
Party	Candidate	Votes	%	±%
ANSA	Edison Baird	338	44.0	N/A
AUF	Rhona Richardson	261	34.0	N/A
AUM	Haydn Hughes	147	19.1	N/A
APP	Anne J. Edwards	22	2.9	N/A
Majority		77	10.0	
Turnout		768		
ANSA hold		Swing	N/A	

General Election 2000: Road North
Party	Candidate	Votes	%	±%
Independent	Edison Baird	364	50.3	N/A
Independent	Rhona Richardson	359	49.7	N/A
Majority		5	0.7	
Turnout		723		
Independent hold		Swing		

=== Elections in the 1990s ===
General Election 1999: Road North
Party	Candidate	Votes	%	±%
ADP	Edison Baird	381	53.1	+2.3
ANA	David Carthy	337	46.9	+2.5
Majority		44	6.1	
Turnout		718		
ADP hold		Swing	-0.1	

General Election 1994: Road North
Party	Candidate	Votes	%	±%
ADP	Edison Baird	294	50.8	+8.4
ANA	David Carthy	257	44.4	−13.2
AUP	Restormel Franklin	28	4.8	N/A
Majority		37	6.4	
Turnout		579		
ADP gain from ANA		Swing	10.8	

=== Elections in the 1980s ===
General Election 1989: Road North
Party	Candidate	Votes	%	±%
ANA	Emile Gumbs	274	57.6	
ADP	Edison Baird	202	42.4	
Majority		72	15.1	
Turnout		476		
