= Victor Banks =

Anguillan politician

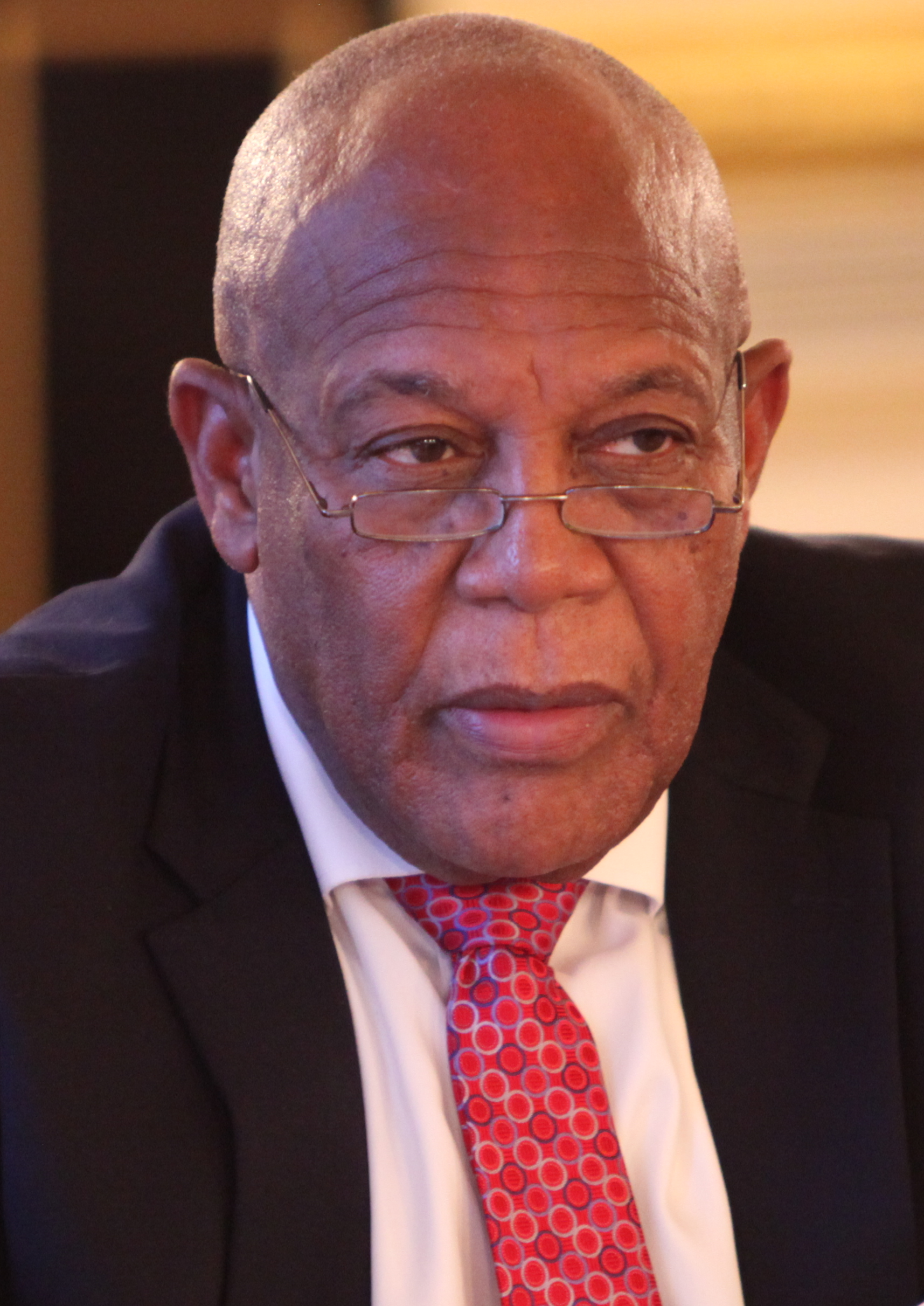

Premier of Anguilla
- In office 14 May 2019 – 30 June 2020
- Monarch: Elizabeth II
- Governor: Tim Foy
- Preceded by: Office created
- Succeeded by: Ellis Webster

Chief Minister of Anguilla
- In office 23 April 2015 – 13 May 2019

Minister of Finance, Economic Development, Investment, Commerce and Tourism
- In office 2005–2010

Minister of Finance, Economic Development, Investment and Commerce
- In office 2000–2005

Minister of Finance and Economic Development
- In office 1994–1999

Minister of Social Services
- In office 1981–1984

Member of the House of Assembly for Valley South
- In office 23 April 2015 – 30 June 2020

Member of the House of Assembly for Valley South
- In office 1985–2010

Member of the House of Assembly for Valley North
- In office 1981–1984

Personal details
- Born: 8 November 1947 (age 77); The Valley, Anguilla
- Political party: Anguilla Democratic Party (part of the Anguilla United Front)

Victor Franklin Banks (born 8 November 1947) is an Anguillan politician. A member of the Anguilla United Front (AUF), he served as Premier from 14 May 2019 until his defeat in the 2020 general election.

== Biography ==
The oldest of six siblings, Banks grew up in The Valley. His father died when he was a teenager. His first job was as a teacher at Valley Secondary School, where he worked from 1964 until 1968. He then attended the University of the Virgin Islands, where he obtained a BA in social sciences in 1972. He then attended the New School for Social Research in New York City, where he obtained a master's degree in political science. He started a PhD at the same institution, but left in 1979 at the all but dissertation stage.

A member of the Anguilla National Alliance, he was elected to the House of Assembly in the Valley North constituency in the 1981 elections. Then 33, he became the island's youngest government minister when he was appointed Minister of Social Services. He moved to the Anguilla Democratic Party (ADP) prior to the 1984 elections, in which he lost his seat and place in the cabinet.

In a by-election in 1985 he was elected in the Valley South Constituency for the ADP. He retained the Valley South seat until the 2010 elections. In 1994 he was appointed Minister of Finance and Economic Development, serving until 1999. In 2000 he became Minister of Finance, Economic Development, Investment and Commerce, with Tourism added to the portfolio in 2005. He left the cabinet after losing his seat in 2010.

Banks became Chief Minister (renamed to Premier in 2019) after the AUF won six of the seven elected seats in the House of Assembly in the 2015 elections, in which he also regained the Valley South seat.
