= Valley North (Anguilla House of Assembly Constituency) =

Valley North is a constituency of the Anguillan House of Assembly. The incumbent is Evans Rodgers of the Anguilla United Front.

== Representatives ==
Election	Member	Party
1989; 1994; 1999; 2000	Eric Reid	ANA
2005; 2010; 2015	Evan Rodgers	AUF
2020	Evan Rodgers	AUF

== Election results ==
=== Elections in the 2020s ===
2020 Anguillan general election: Valley North
Party	Candidate	Votes	%	±%
AUF	Evans Rodgers	697	51.5	-16.1
APM	Courtney Morton	657	48.5	N/A
Majority		40	3.0	
Turnout		1.354		
AUF hold		Swing	N/A	

=== Elections in the 2010s ===
General Election 2015: Valley North
Party	Candidate	Votes	%	±%
AUF	Evans Rodgers	948	67.6	+16.7
AUM	Elkin Richardson	396	28.2	N/A
Dove Party	Sutcliffe Hodge	58	4.1	−45.0
Majority		294	39.4	
Turnout		1,402		
AUF hold		Swing	N/A	

General Election 2010: Valley North
Party	Candidate	Votes	%	±%
AUF	Evans Rodgers	679	50.9	+0.9
Independent	Sutcliffe Hodge	654	49.1	N/A
Majority		25	1.9	
Turnout		1,333		
AUF hold		Swing	N/A	

=== Elections in the 2000s ===
General Election 2005: Valley North
Party	Candidate	Votes	%	±%
AUF	Evans Rodgers	609	50.0	−31.5
ANSA	Ralph V.C. Hodge	354	29.1	N/A
Independent	Leroy C. Rogers	211	17.3	N/A
Independent	Valencia R.C. Hodge	43	3.5	−10.3
Majority		255	21.0	
Turnout		1,217		
AUF gain from ANA		Swing	N/A	

General Election 2000: Valley North
Party	Candidate	Votes	%	±%
ANA	Eric Reid	691	81.5	+27.7
Independent	Valencia R.C. Hodge	117	13.8	N/A
MGD	John Benjamin	40	4.7	N/A
Majority		574	67.7	
Turnout		848		
ANA hold		Swing	N/A	

=== Elections in the 1990s ===
General Election 1999: Valley North
Party	Candidate	Votes	%	±%
ANA	Eric Reid	548	53.8	+3.2
ADP	Leroy C. Rogers	470	46.2	−3.2
Majority		78	7.7	
Turnout		1,018		
ANA hold		Swing	+3.2	

General Election 1994: Valley North
Party	Candidate	Votes	%	±%
ANA	Eric Reid	411	50.6	−6.9
ADP	Leroy C. Rogers	402	49.4	+15.0
Majority		9	1.1	
Turnout		813		
ANA hold		Swing	-11.0	

=== Elections in the 1980s ===
General Election 1989: Valley North
Party	Candidate	Votes	%	±%
ANA	Eric Reid	414	57.5	
ADP	Leroy C. Rogers	248	34.4	
PACE	Ophelia Richardson	58	8.1	
Majority		166	23.1	
Turnout		720		
ANA hold		Swing		
