= Albena Lake-Hodge =

Anguillan politician

- Born: 1920; Anguilla
- Died: October 22, 1985 (aged 64–65)
- Occupations: educator, politician

Albena Lake-Hodge (1920 – October 22, 1985) was an educator and politician in Anguilla. She was known as "Teacher Albena".

She was head of the Valley Girls' School in Anguilla. In 1970, she guided the amalgamation of the Valley Girls' School and Valley Boys' School into the Valley Primary School.

Lake-Hodge was elected to the Anguilla House of Assembly in 1976 and served as Minister of Social Services from 1976 to 1980. She supported the motion of no confidence which brought down the government of Ronald Webster in 1977. She defeated Webster in 1984 in the constituency of Valley South and was named Minister of Education in the Executive Council. She resigned from her ministerial post in July 1985 due to health problems. She died in office 3 months later.

Lake-Hodge was a founding member of the Anguilla National Alliance. She played an important role in establishing the National Bank of Anguilla.

Albena Lake Hodge Comprehensive School was named in her honour. A postage stamp bearing her image was issued by Anguilla in 1999.
