= 2005 Anguillian general election =

General elections were held in Anguilla on 21 February 2005 to elect the seven elected seats in the House of Assembly. The Anguilla United Front, an alliance of the Anguilla National Alliance and the Anguilla Democratic Party, won the elections retaining four of the elected seats.

== Background ==
In the previous elections in 2000, the governing Anguilla United Party was defeated by a coalition of the Anguilla National Alliance and the Anguilla Democratic Party. Together the two parties won four of the seven elected seats and the leader of the Anguilla National Alliance, Osbourne Fleming, became Chief Minister. In May 2004 the leadership of the opposition passed from Hubert Hughes, leader of the Anguilla United Movement party, to Edison Baird, leader of the Anguilla Strategic Alliance. This came after one member of the House of Assembly, Albert Hughes, changed parties.

== Electoral system ==
The House of Assembly has 11 members. Seven members are directly elected by the plurality voting system while the other four members are appointed. One of the appointed members is chosen by the governing party, while the other three are appointed by the Governor, with one of the three appointments being made in consultation with the opposition.

== Campaign ==
Towards the end of January 2005 Chief Minister Osbourne Fleming announced that the election would be held on 21 February, with nominations required by the 8 February. A record 25 candidates put themselves up for election by the 7,560 eligible voters.

The governing Anguilla United Front stood based on the development they had brought over the past five years, including the island's first 18 hole golf course, the renovation of Wallblake Airport and plans for a luxury hotel. Osbourne Fleming claimed that the developments would bring jobs and had made Anguilla significantly different from how it had been five years before.

Three opposition parties, the Anguilla Strategic Alliance, Anguilla United Movement and Anguilla Progressive Party fielded candidates. Opposition leader Edison Baird of the Anguilla Strategic Alliance said that the government had not been open enough in explaining how the development project would benefit ordinary Anguillans. Opposition parties also criticised tax concessions given to the company who would be building the luxury hotel.

== Results ==
All 6 incumbents who sought re-election kept their seats in the election. The only change took place in Valley North where the previous representative, Eric Reid, stood down and was succeeded by Evans McNeil Rogers.

Party	Votes	%	Seats	+/–
Anguilla United Front	2,177	39.09	4	0
Anguilla United Movement	1,088	19.54	1	–1
Anguilla Strategic Alliance	1,076	19.32	2	New
Anguilla Progressive Party	497	8.92	0	New
Independents	731	13.13	0	–1
Appointed members			4	+2
Total	5,569	100.00	11	+2
Valid votes	5,569	98.92		
Invalid/blank votes	61	1.08		
Total votes	5,630	100.00		
Registered voters/turnout	7,558	74.49		
Source: Anguilla Elections, Caribbean Elections

=== By constituency ===
Constituency	Candidate	Party	Votes	%
1 - Island Harbour	Kenneth Harrigan	Anguilla United Front	459	59.61
1 - Island Harbour	Joshua Hodge	Independent	167	21.69
1 - Island Harbour	Barbara Webster-Bourne	Independent	102	13.25
1 - Island Harbour	Londrade Hodge	Independent	42	5.45
2 - Sandy Hill	Osbourne Fleming	Anguilla United Front	309	68.82
2 - Sandy Hill	Jerome Roberts	Anguilla Progressive Party	107	23.83
2 - Sandy Hill	George Hodge	Anguilla United Movement	33	7.35
3 - Valley North	Evans Rogers	Anguilla United Front	609	50.04
3 - Valley North	Ralph Hodge	Anguilla Strategic Alliance	354	29.09
3 - Valley North	Leroy Rogers	Independent	211	17.34
3 - Valley North	Valencia Hodge	Independent	43	3.53
4 - Valley South	Victor Banks	Anguilla United Front	539	54.12
4 - Valley South	Evan Gumbs	Anguilla United Movement	349	35.04
4 - Valley South	Iwandai Gumbs	Independent	108	10.84
5 - Road North	Edison Baird	Anguilla Strategic Alliance	338	44.01
5 - Road North	Rhona Richardson	Anguilla United Front	261	33.98
5 - Road North	Haydn Hughes	Anguilla United Movement	147	19.14
5 - Road North	Anne Edwards	Anguilla Progressive Party	22	2.86
6 - Road South	Hubert Hughes	Anguilla United Movement	420	44.54
6 - Road South	Brent Davis	Anguilla Progressive Party	241	25.56
6 - Road South	Curtis Richardson	Anguilla Strategic Alliance	224	23.75
6 - Road South	Jere Gumbs	Independent	58	6.15
7 - West End	Albert Hughes	Anguilla Strategic Alliance	160	37.56
7 - West End	Walcott Richardson	Anguilla United Movement	139	32.63
7 - West End	Wilmoth Hodge	Anguilla Progressive Party	127	29.81

== Aftermath ==
The day after the elections was declared a national holiday and the four elected members of the Anguilla United Front were sworn into government by the Governor Alan Huckle. Following the election, Albert Hughes, left the Anguilla Strategic Alliance and joined the government. This meant the opposition was evenly split between the Anguilla Strategic Alliance and the Anguilla United Movement, so the Governor did not appoint a Leader of the Opposition.
