= Elections in Anguilla =

Electoral districts in Anguilla

Anguilla elects on territorial level a legislature. The House of Assembly has 13 members, 7 members elected for a five-year term in single-seat constituencies, 4 members elected at large and 2 ex officio members. Anguilla has a multi-party system.

== Latest election ==
Party	Constituency			At-large			Total seats	+/–
Party	Votes	%	Seats	Votes	%	Seats	Total seats	+/–
Anguilla Progressive Movement	3,689	51.33	4	11,971	42.80	3	7	+7
Anguilla United Front	3,170	44.11	3	9,820	35.11	1	4	−2
Independents	328	4.56	0	6,181	22.10	0	0	−1
Ex offico members							2	0
Total	7,187	100.00	7	27,972	100.00	4	13	0
Valid votes	7,187	98.55						
Invalid/blank votes	106	1.45						
Total votes	7,293	100.00						
Registered voters/turnout	11,951	61.02						
Source: Central Electoral Office, Central Electoral Office

== See also ==
- Electoral calendar
- Electoral system
