= Valley South (Anguilla House of Assembly Constituency) =

Valley South is a constituency of the Anguillan House of Assembly. The incumbent is Dee-Ann Kentish-Rogers of the Anguilla Progressive Movement.

== Representatives ==
Election	Member	Party
1989	Victor Banks	ADP
1994	Victor Banks	ADP
1999	Victor Banks	ADP
2000	Victor Banks	ADP
2005	Victor Banks	AUF
2010	Evan Gumbs	AUM
2015	Victor Banks	AUF
2020	Dee-Ann Kentish-Rogers	APM

== Election results ==
=== Elections in the 2020s ===
General Election 2020: Valley South
Party	Candidate	Votes	%	±%
APM	Dee-Ann Kentish-Rogers	861	53.2	N/A
AUF	Victor Banks	755	46.7	-14.0
Majority		106	6.5	
Turnout		1616		
APM gain from AUF		Swing	N/A	

=== Elections in the 2010s ===
General Election 2015: Valley South
Party	Candidate	Votes	%	±%
AUF	Victor Banks	1057	60.7	+14.5
AUM	Evan Gumbs	655	37.6	−16.1
Dove Party	Leonard Kentish	28	1.6	N/A
Majority		402	23.1	
Turnout		1740		
AUF gain from AUM		Swing	N/A	

General Election 2010: Valley South
Party	Candidate	Votes	%	±%
AUM	Evan Gumbs	788	53.8	+18.8
AUF	Victor Banks	677	46.2	−7.9
Majority		111	7.6	
Turnout		1465		
AUM gain from AUF		Swing	+13.4	

=== Elections in the 2000s ===
General Election 2005: Valley South
Party	Candidate	Votes	%	±%
AUF	Victor Banks	539	54.1	−10.7
AUM	Evan Gumbs	349	35.0	N/A
Independent	Iwandai Gumbs	108	10.8	−7.9
Majority		190	19.1	
Turnout		996		
AUF hold		Swing	N/A	

General Election 2000: Valley South
Party	Candidate	Votes	%	±%
ADP	Victor Banks	536	64.8	+2.8
Independent	Iwandai Gumbs	155	18.7	N/A
MGD	Joyce Kentish	136	16.4	N/A
Majority		381	46.1	
Turnout		827		
ADP hold		Swing	N/A	

=== Elections in the 1990s ===
General Election 1999: Valley South
Party	Candidate	Votes	%	±%
ADP	Victor Banks	503	62.0	+0.2
ANA	Blondell Rodgers	237	29.2	−6.9
Independent	Ronald J. Webster	71	8.8	N/A
Majority		266	32.8	
Turnout		811		
ADP hold		Swing	3.6	

General Election 1994: Valley South
Party	Candidate	Votes	%	±%
ADP	Victor Banks	525	61.8	−11.3
ANA	Merritt Lake	307	36.1	+2.5
Anguilla United Party	Evan R. Lake	18	2.1	N/A
Majority		218	25.6	
Turnout		850		
ADP hold		Swing	-6.9	

=== Elections in the 1980s ===
General Election 1989: Valley South
Party	Candidate	Votes	%	±%
ADP	Victor Banks	372	50.5	
ANA	Orealia Kelly	248	33.6	
PACE	Curthwin Webster	117	15.9	
Majority		124	16.8	
Turnout		737		
ADP hold		Swing		
