= 2015 Anguillian general election =

- 22 April 2015

7 of the 11 seats in the House of Assembly
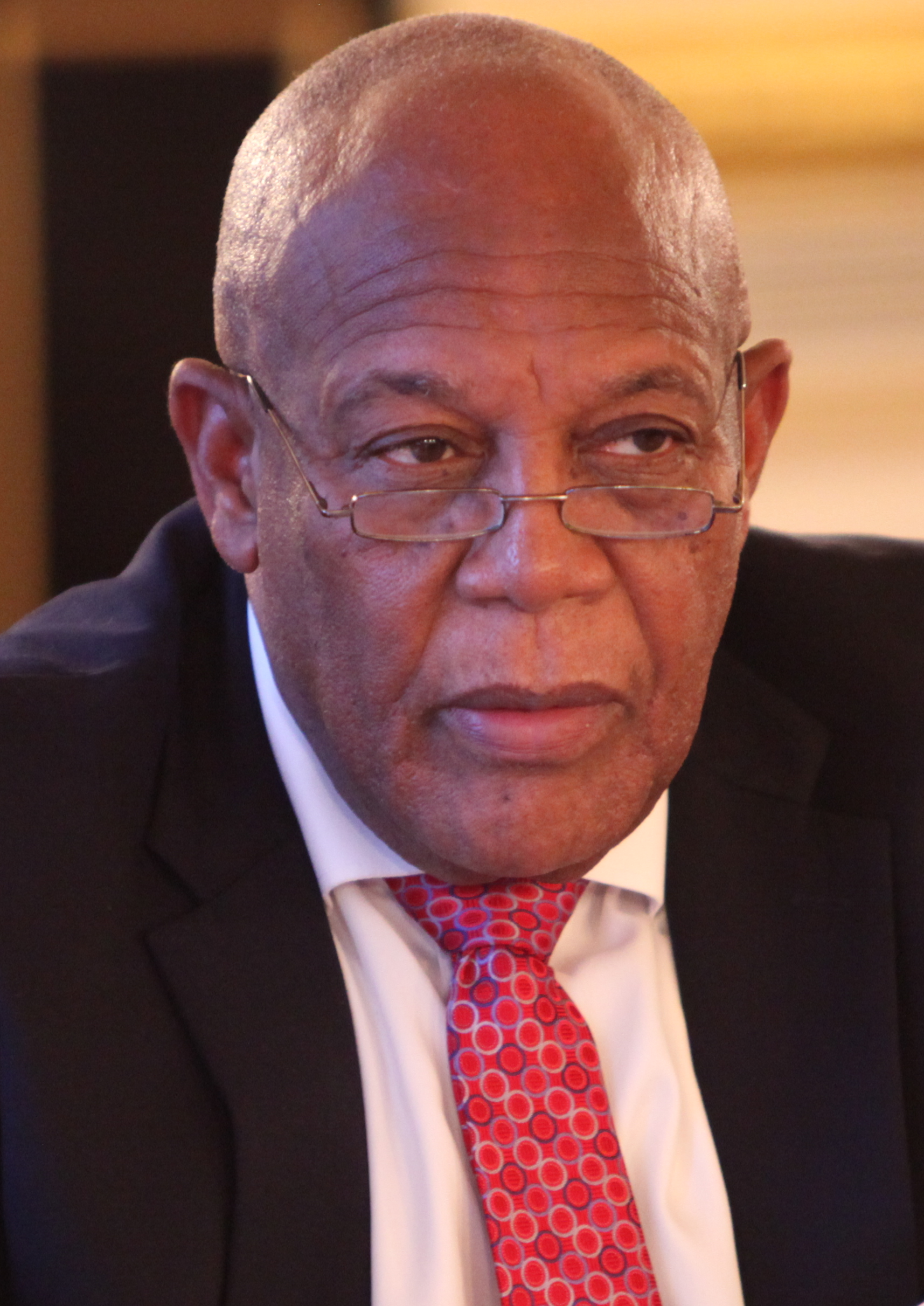

	First party	Second party
Leader	Victor Banks	Palmavon Webster
Party	AUF	Independent
Last election	2 seats	0 seats
Seats won	6	1
Seat change	▲4	▲1
Chief Minister before election
Hubert Hughes
Anguilla United Movement
Elected Chief Minister
Victor Banks
Anguilla United Front

General elections were held in Anguilla on 22 April 2015. The result was a victory for the Anguilla United Front alliance, which won six of the seven elected seats in the House of Assembly. The ruling Anguilla United Movement failed to win a seat.

== Electoral system ==
At the time of the elections the House of Assembly had eleven members, of which seven are elected in single-member constituencies and four were appointed. Voters had to be at least 18 years old, whilst candidates had to be at least 21.

== Results ==
Party	Votes	%	Seats	+/–
Anguilla United Front	4,324	54.44	6	+4
Anguilla United Movement	3,039	38.26	0	–4
Democracy, Opportunity, Vision & Empowerment Party	110	1.38	0	New
Anguilla National Alliance	10	0.13	0	–
Independents	460	5.79	1	+1
Appointed members			4	0
Total	7,943	100.00	11	0
Valid votes	7,943	99.42		
Invalid/blank votes	46	0.58		
Total votes	7,989	100.00		
Registered voters/turnout	10,908	73.24		
Source: Anguilla Elections, Election Passport

=== By constituency ===
The closest contest was in the Road North constituency, where the AUF candidate Evalie Bradley won by a single vote against the AUM candidate Patrick Hanley.

Constituency	Candidate	Party	Votes	%
1 - Island Harbour	Palmavon Webster	Independent	460	35.22
1 - Island Harbour	Othlyn Vanterpool	Anguilla United Front	434	33.23
1 - Island Harbour	Ellis Webster	Anguilla United Movement	412	31.55
2 - Sandy Hill	Cora Richardson-Hodge	Anguilla United Front	461	60.98
2 - Sandy Hill	Jerome Roberts	Anguilla United Movement	295	39.02
3 - Valley North	Evans Rogers	Anguilla United Front	948	67.62
3 - Valley North	Elkin Richardson	Anguilla United Movement	396	28.25
3 - Valley North	Sutcliffe Hodge	Democracy, Opportunity, Vision & Empowerment Party	58	4.14
4 - Valley South	Victor Banks	Anguilla United Front	1,057	60.75
4 - Valley South	Evan Gumbs	Anguilla United Movement	655	37.64
4 - Valley South	Leonard Kentish	Democracy, Opportunity, Vision & Empowerment Party	28	1.61
5 - Road North	Evalie Bradley	Anguilla United Front	394	50.06
5 - Road North	Patrick Hanley	Anguilla United Movement	393	49.94
6 - Road South	Curtis Richardson	Anguilla United Front	641	51.28
6 - Road South	Haydn Hughes	Anguilla United Movement	575	46.00
6 - Road South	Clifton Niles	Democracy, Opportunity, Vision & Empowerment Party	24	1.92
6 - Road South	Statchel Warner	Anguilla National Alliance	10	0.80
7 - West End	Cardigan Connor	Anguilla United Front	389	55.41
7 - West End	Kristy Richardson	Anguilla United Movement	313	44.59

== Aftermath ==
Following the elections, Victor Banks of the Anguilla United Front was sworn in as the island's new Chief Minister.
