= Road North =

Road North may refer to:

- Road North (Anguilla House of Assembly Constituency)
- Road North (film), Finnish film
