= 2010 general election =

2010 general election may refer to:

- 2010 Anguillan general election
- 2010 Australian federal election
- 2010 Bougainvillean general election
- 2010 Brazilian general election
- 2010 Burmese general election
- 2010 Cook Islands general election
- 2010 Costa Rican general election
- 2010 Dutch general election
- 2010 Ethiopian general election
- 2010 Haitian general election
- 2010 Mauritian general election
- 2010 Netherlands Antilles general election
- 2010 New Brunswick general election
- 2010 Philippine general election
- 2010 Saint Kitts and Nevis general election
- 2010 Solomon Islands general election
- 2010 Sudanese general election
- 2010 Swedish general election
- 2010 Tanzanian general election
- 2010 Tongan general election
- 2010 Trinidad and Tobago general election
- 2010 United Kingdom general election
