= Cardigan Connor =

West Indian cricketer

Personal information
- Full name: Cardigan Adolphus Connor
- Born: 24 March 1961 (age 65); The Valley, Anguilla
- Nickname: Christy, Cardy
- Height: 5 ft 10 in (1.78 m)
- Batting: Right-handed
- Bowling: Right-arm fast-medium

Domestic team information
- Years: Team
- 1984–1998: Hampshire
- 1979–1984: Buckinghamshire

Career statistics
Competition	FC	LA
Matches	221	300
Runs scored	1,814	335
Batting average	11.93	6.32
100s/50s	–/2	–/–
Top score	59	25
Balls bowled	37,397	14,625
Wickets	614	411
Bowling average	31.74	25.07
5 wickets in innings	18	1
10 wickets in match	4	–
Best bowling	9/38	5/25
Catches/stumpings	61/–	55/–
- Source: Cricinfo, 8 December 2009

Cardigan Connor
- Incumbent
- Assumed office 23 April 2015

Member of the House of Assembly for West End
- Incumbent
- Assumed office 2015

Personal details
- Party: Anguilla United Front

Cardigan Adolphus Connor (born 24 March 1961) is an Anguillan born former English cricketer. Connor was a right-handed batsman and a right-arm fast-medium bowler.

== Career ==
Connor left his home island of Anguilla in 1979 to pursue a cricketing career in England. Connor was signed by Buckinghamshire in 1979 and remained at the club for five years playing in the Minor Counties Championship. Connor was eventually spotted by former Hampshire cricketer Charlie Knott who recommended him to Hampshire, who signed him for the 1984 season.

Connor made his first-class debut for Hampshire against Somerset. This was to be the first of Connor's 221 first-class matches for the club. The same year Connor made his List-A debut against Nottinghamshire in the John Player Special League. Connor would go on to play 300 one-day matches for the club.

Connor formed a deadly partnership with his fellow West Indian new ball bowler Malcolm Marshall, often trying to compete with his partner for pace. Connor was a member of the 1988 Benson and Hedges Cup Hampshire team, taking two wickets in the final at Lord's. A further honour came in 1991 when Connor was again a member of the Hampshire winning team, this time in the 1991 NatWest Trophy where he took three wickets, including that of future England batsman Graham Thorpe for 93. There was call for Connor being called up to the England one-day squad, but this never materialised. Connor tasted success for a second time in the Benson and Hedges Cup, this time in 1992 when Hampshire beat Kent. Connor took a single wicket in the match, that of Mark Ealham.

In 1994 he was named the Hampshire Cricket Society Player of the Year. By this time Connor was something of a cult figure at the County Ground. Connor took his best innings bowling figures during the 1996 County Championship. In a match against Gloucestershire he took 9/38, this at a time when Malcolm Marshall had retired.

Connor made his final first-class appearance for Hampshire in a County Championship match against Derbyshire in 1998, although that season he played just four first-class matches for the club. His final one-day appearance came on 13 September 1998 in an AXA League match against Worcestershire. Connor retired at the end of the 1998 season. In total Connor took over 1,000 wickets for Hampshire. Testament to Connor's cult figure at the club, his benefit year raised £147,000.

== After cricket ==
After retiring from cricket, Connor returned to Anguilla. He was Anguilla's 'chef de mission' (team manager) at the 2002 Commonwealth Games in Manchester. Connor currently works as a hotel masseur and a fitness coach, with a website calling him "the island's most popular personal trainer".

At the Anguillian general election in April 2015 Connor was elected in District 7 – West End for the Anguilla United Front.

After the 2025 Anguillan general election, Connor became deputy premier to newly-elected premier Cora Richardson-Hodge.
