= 1989 Anguillian general election =

General elections were held in Anguilla in February 1989. The Anguilla National Alliance emerged as the largest party, winning three of the seven seats in the House of Assembly.

== Results ==
David Carty and Claudel Romney were appointed as the nominated members.

Party	Votes	%	Seats	+/–
Anguilla National Alliance	1,435	38.77	3	–1
Anguilla Democratic Party	934	25.24	1	New
Anguilla United Party	824	22.26	2	0
Party for Anguilla's Culturation and Economy	175	4.73	0	New
Anguilla for Good Governance	75	2.03	0	New
Independents	258	6.97	1	0
Appointed members			2	0
Total	3,701	100.00	9	0
Valid votes	3,701	97.37		
Invalid/blank votes	100	2.63		
Total votes	3,801	100.00		
Registered voters/turnout	5,190	73.24		
Source: Anguilla Elections, Caribbean Elections

=== By constituency ===
Constituency	Candidate	Party	Votes	%
1 - Island Harbour	Kenneth Harrigan	Anguilla National Alliance	389	56.05
1 - Island Harbour	Ronald Webster	Anguilla United Party	305	43.95
2 - Sandy Hill	Osbourne Fleming	Independent	212	67.52
2 - Sandy Hill	George Hodge	Anguilla United Party	102	32.48
3 - Valley North	Eric Reid	Anguilla National Alliance	414	57.50
3 - Valley North	Leroy Rogers	Anguilla Democratic Party	248	34.44
3 - Valley North	Ophelia Richardson	Party for Anguilla's Culturation and Economy	58	8.06
4 - Valley South	Victor Banks	Anguilla Democratic Party	372	53.37
4 - Valley South	Orealia Kelly	Anguilla National Alliance	208	29.84
4 - Valley South	Cuthwin Webster	Party for Anguilla's Culturation and Economy	117	16.79
5 - Road North	Emile Gumbs	Anguilla National Alliance	274	57.56
5 - Road North	Edison Baird	Anguilla Democratic Party	202	42.44
6 - Road South	Hubert Hughes	Anguilla United Party	289	54.12
6 - Road South	Statchel Warner	Anguilla National Alliance	150	28.09
6 - Road South	Maurice Connor	Anguilla Democratic Party	49	9.18
6 - Road South	Lolita Davis-Ifille	Independent	46	8.61
7 - West End	Albert Hughes	Anguilla United Party	128	48.12
7 - West End	Omah Richardson	Anguilla for Good Governance	75	28.20
7 - West End	Kenswick Richardson	Anguilla Democratic Party	63	23.68
