= Evalie A. Bradley =

Anguillian politician

Member of the House of Assembly of Anguilla
- In office 23 April 2015 – 2020

Personal details
- Born: Evalie Bradley nee Hughes; 12 October 1954 (age 71)
- Spouse: Widowed
- Children: Perin; Kwahme; Shakeem; Kareem; Dale (stepson)

Evalie Bradley nee Hughes (12 October 1954) is an Anguillian politician who served as Member of the House of Assembly of Anguilla between 2015 and 2020.

== Early life and education ==
Bradley started attending Road Primary School, currently named Adrian T. Hazell Primary, and received elementary education at the Valley Secondary School. After completing her secondary education, she was among the first cohort of Anguillian students to receive a UK Technical Cooperation; she graduated with a diploma on Executive Administrative Secretarial Science at the Sir Authur Lewis Technical College in Saint Lucia. She has also undertaken several development, management and training programmes at the Thames Valley University, the Manitoba Institute of Management and the University of the West Indies.

== Career ==
After completing her studies Bradley returned to Anguilla and was appointed as a government administrative secretary, and ever since has held several public service positions, such as clerk to the Executive Council and House of Assembly, Deputy Director of Human Resources, Labour Commissioner in 2001, and Principal Assistant Secretary in the Chief Minister’s Office in 2005, before retiring in 2007.

Evalie was a first time candidate for elected office and Anguilla United Front (AUF) ticket in the 22 April 2015 election for District 5, Road North and narrowly defeated Anguilla United Movement (AUM) candidate Patrick Hanley by a single vote. Bradley secured 394 votes (49.81%) to Hanley's 393 votes (49.68%). Cora Richardson-Hodge, Pam Webster and Evalie Bradley became the first elected women parliamentarian since the election of Albena Lake-Hodge in 1984.

== Personal life ==
Bradley tutored students for many years in typewriting and has been an active local preacher in the Methodist Church. She has also been president of the Bethel Women’s Association.
