= Quincia Gumbs-Marie =

Politician in Anguilla

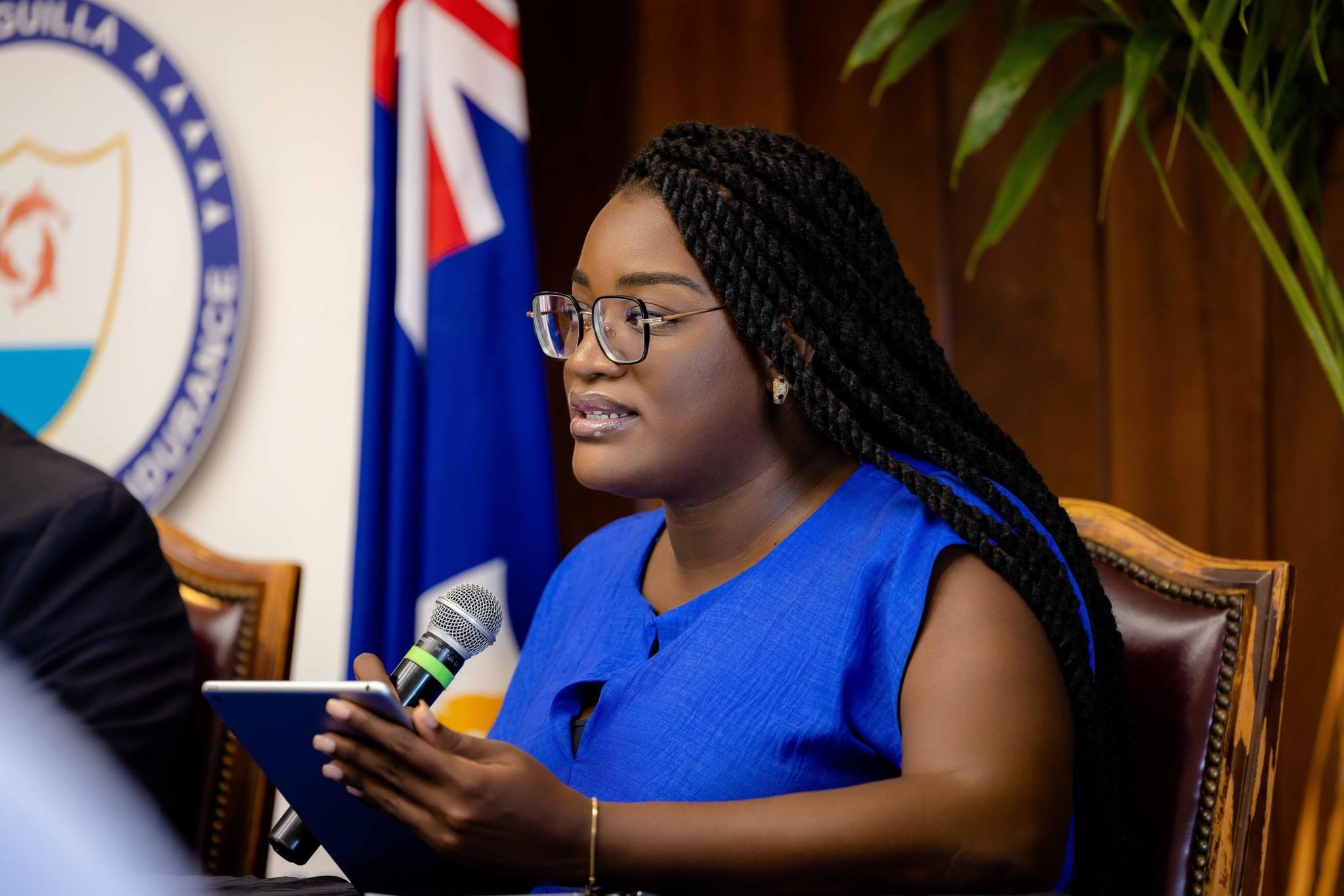

Minister of Sustainability, Innovation and the Environment
- Incumbent
- Assumed office July 2022

Parliamentary Secretary of Information Technology, Natural Resources, Economic Development and Tourism
- In office June 2020 – July 2022

Personal details
- Party: Anguilla Progressive Movement

Quincia Gumbs-Marie is a politician and environmentalist from Anguilla, who was elected in June 2020 representing the Anguilla Progressive Movement to the Government of Anguilla. Her first role in office was as Parliamentary Secretary of Information Technology, Natural Resources, Economic Development and Tourism. The timing meant that she became responsible for developing a strategy for the re-opening of tourism due to COVID-19 in Anguilla. At COP26 she spoke on the work of the Blue Anguilla (BANG) Committee, which works to amplify the role of the blue economy in Anguilla. In July 2022 a new ministry was formed, which Gumbs-Marie leads as Honourable Minister of Sustainability, Innovation and the Environment. She has spoken out on how sustainability and economic development in Anguilla are intrinsically linked.
