= Julia Crouch (diplomat) =

Governor of Anguilla since 2023

Her Excellency Julia Crouch OBE
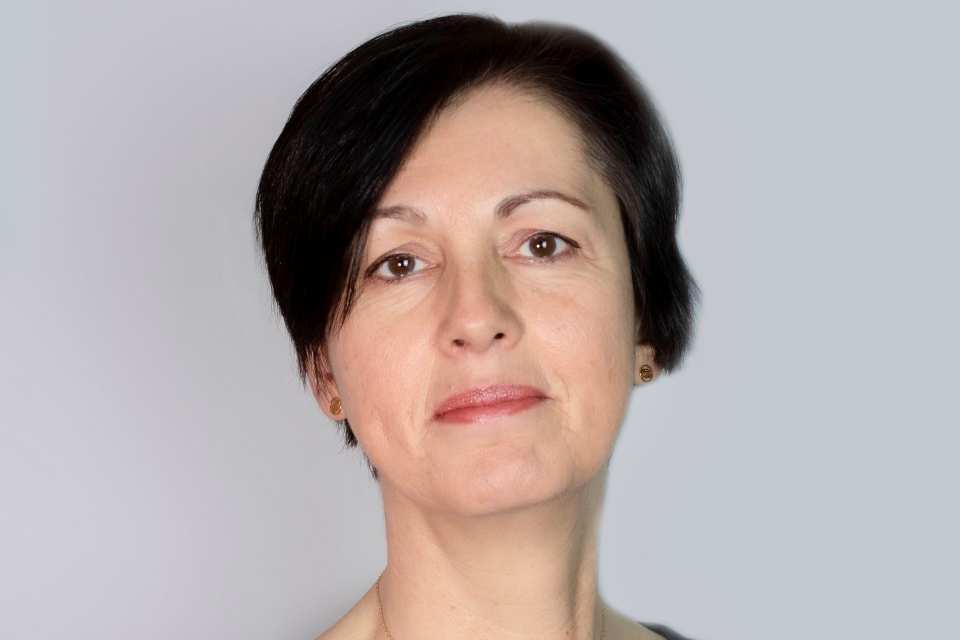

15th Governor of Anguilla
- Incumbent
- Assumed office 11 September 2023
- Monarch: Charles III
- Premier: Ellis Webster (2023-2025); Cora Richardson-Hodge (2025- )
- Preceded by: Dileeni Daniel-Selvaratnam

Personal details
- Born: 2 July 1967 (age 59)
- Education: Wadham College, University of Oxford

Julia Crouch OBE (born 2 July 1967) is a British lawyer and diplomat. She has been Governor of Anguilla since 2023.

== Biography ==
Julia Crouch was born on 2 January 1967. After school in Henley-on-Thames, she took an LLB degree at Wadham College, Oxford.

== Career ==
After legal professional studies at Nottingham Trent University, Crouch qualified as a solicitor in 1992. She worked in private practice, in legal advice centres, and in the charity sector until 2005, when she became a government lawyer. She worked in different legal roles in a succession of departments before joining the Foreign and Commonwealth Office in 2018. She rose to become Deputy Director, Information Analysis on the Coronavirus Taskforce in the FCDO before moving into the Diplomatic Service as Acting Deputy Head of Mission (and later Head of Economics and Global Issues) in Moscow in 2020.

In May 2023, the UK government announced that Crouch had been appointed Governor of Anguilla. She was sworn into office on 11 September 2023.

In early 2025, Crouch exercised her powers to dissolve the House of Assembly ahead of a general election. The election was won by Anguilla's first female Premier, Cora Richardson-Hodge. In August 2025, Crouch formally repudiated allegations of a breach of the constitution during the election.

== Honours ==
In June 2023, while she was Deputy Head of Mission in Moscow, Crouch was appointed OBE in King Charles III's first Birthday Honours list.

Government offices
Preceded by Dileeni Daniel-Selvaratnam	Governor of Anguilla; 2023–	Incumbent
