= 1999 Anguillian general election =

General elections were held in Anguilla on 4 March 1999. The result was a victory for the ruling coalition of the Anguilla United Party and the Anguilla Democratic Party, each winning 2 seats. The opposition Anguilla National Alliance won 3 seats. However, the coalition government lost its majority in May 1999 upon the resignation of Victor Banks, the Finance Minister and leader of the Anguilla Democratic Party. Due to the collapse of the ruling coalition, fresh elections were held in March 2000.

== Results ==
Party	Votes	%	Seats	+/–
Anguilla National Alliance	2,054	42.76	3	+1
Anguilla Democratic Party	1,579	32.87	2	0
Anguilla United Party	704	14.65	2	0
Independents	467	9.72	0	–1
Appointed members			2	+1
Total	4,804	100.00	9	+1
Valid votes	4,804	99.09		
Invalid/blank votes	44	0.91		
Total votes	4,848	100.00		
Registered voters/turnout	6,578	73.70		
Source: Anguilla Elections, IFES

=== By constituency ===
Constituency	Candidate	Party	Votes	%
1 - Island Harbour	Kenneth Harrigan	Anguilla National Alliance	483	59.93
1 - Island Harbour	Barbara Webster-Bourne	Anguilla Democratic Party	225	27.92
1 - Island Harbour	Franklin Richardson	Independent	98	12.16
2 - Sandy Hill	Osbourne Fleming	Anguilla National Alliance	303	82.11
2 - Sandy Hill	Clement Ruan	Independent	66	17.89
3 - Valley North	Eric Reid	Anguilla National Alliance	548	53.83
3 - Valley North	Leroy Rogers	Anguilla Democratic Party	470	46.17
4 - Valley South	Victor Banks	Anguilla Democratic Party	503	62.02
4 - Valley South	Blondell Rodgiers	Anguilla National Alliance	237	29.22
4 - Valley South	Ronald Webster	Independent	71	8.75
5 - Road North	Edison Baird	Anguilla Democratic Party	381	53.06
5 - Road North	David Carty	Anguilla National Alliance	337	46.94
6 - Road South	Hubert Hughes	Anguilla United Party	434	65.17
6 - Road South	Franklin Connor	Independent	232	34.83
7 - West End	Albert Hughes	Anguilla United Party	270	64.90
7 - West End	Kenswick Richardson	Anguilla National Alliance	146	35.10
