= Albena Lake-Hodge Comprehensive School =

Location
- The Valley; Anguilla
- Coordinates: 18.2156295°N 63.05032249999999°W

Information
- Type: Secondary school
- Established: 1953
- Principal: Rita Carty
- Grades: Form 1 - Form 6
- Affiliation: Government of Anguilla
- Website: http://www.alhcs.ai/

Albena Lake-Hodge Comprehensive School (ALHCS) is the sole government secondary school of Anguilla, in The Valley. As of 2017 it had about 1,062 students. It has two campuses, A and B. Forms 1-2 go to campus B while forms 3-6 go to Campus A. It is named after Albena Lake-Hodge.

It opened as The Valley Secondary School on 21 September 1953. Its first principal, J. T. Thom, was from Guyana. It received its current name in 1986. It previously served only Anguilla's elite, but became a universal secondary school.

In 2015 principal Ingrid Lake retired, so Joyce Webster became the principal.

By 2016 the Anguillian government was developing a master plan for the school's redevelopment.

There are 48 Caribbean Advanced Proficiency Examination (CAPE) units offered, as well as 32 Caribbean Secondary Examination Certificate (CSEC) courses.

== See also ==
- Education in Anguilla
