= 1981 Anguillian general election =

Early general elections were held in Anguilla on 22 June 1981. The result was a victory for the Anguilla People's Party, which won five of the seven seats in the House of Assembly.

== Results ==
Oneal Levons and Euton Smith were appointed as the nominated members.

Party	Seats	+/–
Anguilla People's Party	5	–1
Anguilla National Alliance	2	+1
Appointed members	2	0
Total	9	0
Source: Caribbean Elections
