= Attorney General of Anguilla =

The Attorney General's Chambers of Anguilla is responsible for the following:

- Legal Adviser to the Government, Departments, Statutory Boards and Corporations
- Prosecute criminal cases on behalf of the Crown
- Represent the Government in civil actions by and against the Crown
- Advise the Royal Anguilla Police Force regarding investigations and prosecutions
- Draft legislation
- Law revision
- Law reform

Anguilla seceded from Saint Kitts and Nevis and became a British Crown colony in December 1980. Before then, the Attorney General was identified as representing "St. Christopher [Kitts], Nevis and Anguilla." Even by the time Anguilla passed a new constitution in 1982, certain records still showed the same title for the Attorney General.

== List of attorneys general (Post-1980 upon becoming a territory) ==
- Fitzroy Bryant (1979) [referred to as the Attorney General of St. Christopher, Nevis and Anguilla]
- Tapley Seaton (1980-1982) [referred to as the Attorney General of St. Christopher, Nevis and Anguilla]
- Alan Hoole (1983-1985)
- Howard Morrison (1988-1989)
- Alan Hoole (1989-1990)
- Kurt de Freitas (1991-1992)
- Patrick Patterson (1993-1994)
- Kurt de Freitas (1995-1996)
- Ronald Scipio (1997-2006)
- Wilhelm Bourne (2006-2010)
- James Wood (2011-2014)*
- Rupert Jones (2014-2016)
- John McKendrick (2016-2018)*
- Dwight Horsford (2018-present)

*Ivor Greene was the Acting Attorney General during 2013 and 2017.

== See also ==
- Justice ministry
- Politics of Anguilla
