= 2000 Anguillian general election =

Early general elections were held in Anguilla on 3 March 2000 after the government elected in 1999 collapsed after six months. The Anguilla National Alliance (ANA) emerged as the largest party, winning three of the seven seats in the House of Assembly. The ANA and the Anguilla Democratic Party had created the Anguilla United Front in January 2000, and between them the two parties held four of the seven seats, allowing them to form a government.

== Results ==
Party	Votes	%	Seats	+/–
Anguilla National Alliance	1,684	35.40	3	0
Anguilla United Movement	596	12.53	2	0
Anguilla Democratic Party	536	11.27	1	–1
Anguilla Patriotic Movement	194	4.08	0	New
Movement for Grassroots Democracy	176	3.70	0	New
Independents	1,571	33.03	1	+1
Appointed members			2	0
Total	4,757	100.00	9	0
Valid votes	4,757	97.56		
Invalid/blank votes	119	2.44		
Total votes	4,876	100.00		
Registered voters/turnout	7,520	64.84		
Source: Anguilla Elections, Caribbean Elections

=== By constituency ===
Constituency	Candidate	Party	Votes	%
1 - Island Harbour	Kenneth Harrigan	Anguilla National Alliance	495	60.37
1 - Island Harbour	Barbara Webster-Bourne	Independent	221	26.95
1 - Island Harbour	Franklin Richardson	Anguilla Patriotic Movement	104	12.68
2 - Sandy Hill	Osbourne Fleming	Anguilla National Alliance	349	71.81
2 - Sandy Hill	Quincy Gumbs	Anguilla Patriotic Movement	90	18.52
2 - Sandy Hill	Margaret Augustus	Independent	47	9.67
3 - Valley North	Eric Reid	Anguilla National Alliance	691	81.49
3 - Valley North	Valencia Hodge	Independent	117	13.80
3 - Valley North	John Benjamin	Movement for Grass Roots Democracy	40	4.72
4 - Valley South	Victor Banks	Anguilla Democratic Party	536	64.81
4 - Valley South	Iwandai Gumbs	Independent	155	18.74
4 - Valley South	Joyce Kentish	Movement for Grass Roots Democracy	136	16.44
5 - Road North	Edison Baird	Independent	364	50.35
5 - Road North	Rhona Richardson	Independent	359	49.65
6 - Road South	Hubert Hughes	Anguilla United Movement	378	55.10
6 - Road South	Franklin Connor	Independent	308	44.90
7 - West End	Albert Hughes	Anguilla United Movement	218	59.40
7 - West End	Kenswick Richardson	Anguilla National Alliance	149	40.60
