= Hubert Hughes =

Anguillian politician (1933–2021)

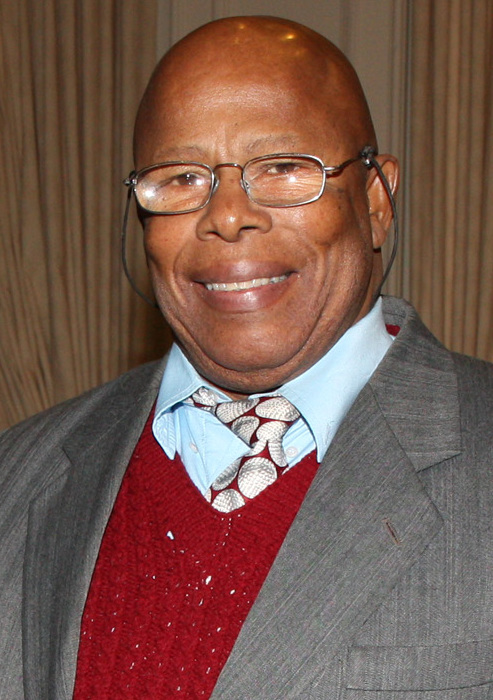

Chief Minister of Anguilla
- In office 16 February 2010 – 23 April 2015
- Monarch: Elizabeth II
- Governor: William Alistair Harrison; Christina Scott
- Preceded by: Osbourne Fleming
- Succeeded by: Victor Banks
- In office 16 March 1994 – 6 March 2000
- Monarch: Elizabeth II
- Governor: Alan William Shave; Alan Hoole; Robert Harris; Roger Cousins (Acting); Peter Johnstone
- Preceded by: Emile Gumbs
- Succeeded by: Osbourne Fleming

Personal details
- Born: 15 October 1933; Island Harbour, Anguilla, Anguilla
- Died: 7 May 2021 (aged 87)
- Political party: Anguilla United Movement

Hubert Benjamin Hughes (15 October 1933 – 7 May 2021) was an Anguillan politician. He was the island territory's Chief Minister from 16 March 1994 to 6 March 2000, and again between February 2010 and April 2015.

Hughes was the only independent elected to parliament in the 1976 Anguillian general election, while the other seats were won by the People's Progressive Party (PPP). He later supported a motion of no confidence against Ronald Webster, which succeeded as he was joined by several members of the PPP.

He had stated his intention to lead the island to separation from the United Kingdom. This is despite the fact that European Union assistance funds, and visa-free entry to the US, Canada, EU and islands in the French and Dutch Caribbean such as Saint Martin would stop.

Political offices
Preceded by Emile Gumbs	Chief Minister of Anguilla; 1994–2000	Succeeded by Osbourne Fleming
Preceded by Osbourne Fleming	Chief Minister of Anguilla; 2015–2019	Succeeded by Victor Banks
