= Roger Cousins =

Anguilla politician

Roger Cousins, OBE, served as acting Governor of Anguilla from 27 January 2000 to 4 February 2000, between the tenures of Robert Harris and Peter Johnstone. He has also served as Her Majesty's Treasury Overseas Allowances Inspector, as well as the Chief Secretary to the Turks and Caicos Islands and Deputy Governor of Anguilla.
