= 1984 Anguillian general election =

Early general elections were held in Anguilla on 9 March 1984. The result was a victory for the Anguilla National Alliance, which won four of the seven seats in the House of Assembly. Chief Minister Ronald Webster lost his seat.

== Results ==
Bob Rogers and Clive Smith were appointed as the nominated members.

| Party | Votes | % | Seats | +/– |
|---|---|---|---|---|
| Anguilla National Alliance | | | 4 | +2 |
| Anguilla People's Party | | | 2 | –3 |
| Independents | | | 1 | New |
| Appointed members | | | 2 | 0 |
| Total | | | 9 | 0 |
| Registered voters/turnout | 3,733 | – | | |
Source: Caribbean Elections
