= People's Progressive Party (Anguilla) =

Former Anguillan political party

The People's Progressive Party (PPP) was a political party in Anguilla. Founded by Ronald Webster in 1976, it won the general elections later that year.

== History ==
The PPP was established in 1976 by Ronald Webster in order to contest the general elections that year. The party won six of the seven seats in the House of Assembly, with Webster becoming the island's first Chief Minister.

However, in February 1977 the House passed a motion of no confidence on Webster by a vote of 5–2. As a result, Emile Gumbs of the Anguilla National Alliance was appointed Chief Minister.

By the 1980 elections Webster had established the Anguilla United Movement, which won six of the seven seats.
