= 1980 Anguillian general election =

General elections were held in Anguilla on 28 May 1980. The result was a victory for the Anguilla United Movement, which won six of the seven seats in the House of Assembly.

== Results ==
Connell Harrigan and Euton Smith were appointed as the nominated members.

Party	Votes	%	Seats	+/–
Anguilla United Movement			6	0
Anguilla National Alliance			1	New
Appointed members			2	0
Total			9	0
Total votes	2,777	–		
Registered voters/turnout	3,508	79.16		
Source: Caribbean Elections
