= Island Harbour, Anguilla =

Island Harbour
- District
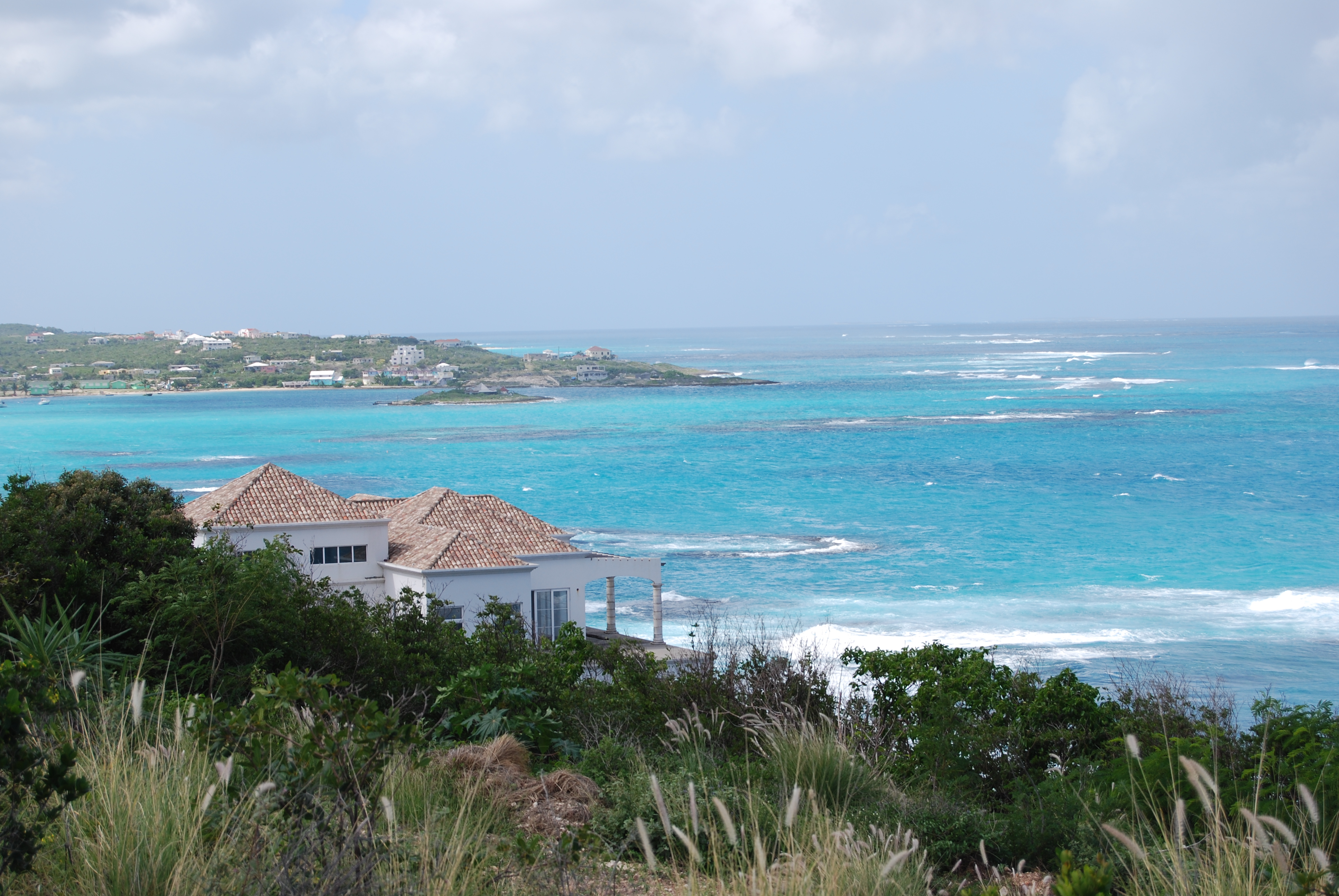

- Location within Anguilla
- Coordinates: 18.25690°N 63.00676°W
- Country: United Kingdom
- Overseas Territory: Anguilla

Area
  - Land: 2.35 sq mi (6.08 km^{2})

Population (2011)
  - Total: 988

Island Harbour is one of the fourteen Districts of Anguilla. Its population at the 2011 census was 988.

== Education ==
There is one government school in the town, Vivian Vanterpool Primary School. Albena Lake-Hodge Comprehensive School in The Valley serves secondary students.

== Demographics ==
Historical population

Year	Pop.	±%
1974	613	—
1984	672	+9.6%
1994	744	+10.7%

Year	Pop.	±%
2001	855	+14.9%
2011	988	+15.6%

Source: Statoids.com

== Politics ==
The incumbent is Othlyn Vanterpool of the Anguilla United Front.
