= Osbourne Fleming =

Chief Minister of Anguilla (born 1940)

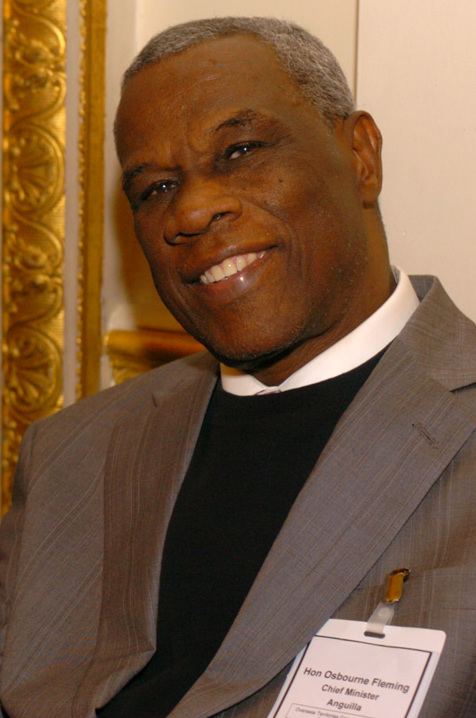
- Fleming in 2009

6th Chief Minister of Anguilla
- In office March 6, 2000 – February 18, 2010
- Preceded by: Hubert Hughes
- Succeeded by: Hubert Hughes

Personal details
- Born: February 18, 1940 (age 86)
- Party: Anguilla National Alliance; Coalition part of the Anguilla United Front

Osbourne Berrington Fleming (born February 18, 1940) is a politician and a former chief minister of Anguilla. He held that post from March 6, 2000, three days after the Anguilla United Front, a conservative coalition which included Fleming's Anguilla National Alliance won parliamentary elections, gaining at least 4 of the 7 seats, until February 15, 2010 in which he retired from his seat as the chief minister of Anguilla.

== Early life ==
Fleming was born on February 18, 1940. Prior to becoming Chief Minister, Fleming was a prominent and successful businessman.

== Political career ==
In 1981 he was elected a member of the House of Assembly representing the East End as a member of the Anguilla Progressive Party. In 1989 he switched parties while retaining the district, this time representing the Anguilla National Alliance. Then, from 1994 to 1999, he became an independent while still remaining a member of the opposition. From 1999 to 2005 he was a member of the Anguilla National Alliance, and finally, for his last few years, from 2005 to 2010, he was a member of the Anguilla United Front. Simultaneously, he served for many years as Minister of Finance before winning the election as Anguilla's Chief Minister.

=== Chief Minister of Anguilla ===
From 2000 to 2010 Fleming served as Chief Minister of Anguilla.

In 2007, Indian workers at the British construction firm Carilion started demonstrations demanding better wages. In July, Fleming responded that the legal representatives of the Indian workers were at a standstill with the employer. However, a few days later, Carilion, which was supported by the government, agreed to raise the wages of the workers. In 2009, Fleming called for Dominica's Prime Minister Roosevelt Skerrit to retract statements after Skerrit suggested that Anguilla was a beneficiary of financial support from Dominica. Fleming stated that no agreement was signed with any country.

=== Post minister role ===
In 2014, he expressed frustration over rumors about party defections from the AUF, and called for unity within the party and promoted Victor Bank. He also called the 2010 elections a serious mistake since AUF was voted out.

== See also ==
- Chief Minister of Anguilla

Preceded by Hubert Hughes	Chief Minister of Anguilla; 2000–2010	Succeeded by Hubert Hughes
