= Politics of Anguilla =

Politics of Anguilla takes place in a framework of a parliamentary representative democratic dependency, whereby the Premier is the head of government, and of a multi-party system. Anguilla, the most northerly of the Leeward Islands in the Lesser Antilles, is an internally self-governing overseas territory of the United Kingdom. The United Nations Committee on Decolonization includes Anguilla on the United Nations list of non-self-governing territories. The territory's constitution is Anguilla Constitutional Order 1 April 1982 (amended 1990 and 2019). Executive power is exercised by the premier and the executive council. Legislative power is vested in both the executive council and the House of Assembly. The Judiciary is independent of the executive and the legislature. Military defence is the responsibility of the United Kingdom.

== Executive branch ==
Main office-holders
Office	Name	Party	Since
Monarch	Charles III		8 September 2022
Governor	Julia Crouch		11 September 2023
Premier	Cora Richardson-Hodge	AUF	27 February 2025

The Premier appointed by the governor from among the members of the House of Assembly. His cabinet, the Executive Council, is appointed by the governor from among the elected members of the House of Assembly.

== Legislative branch ==
Anguilla elects on territorial level a legislature. The House of Assembly has 13 members, 7 members elected for a five-year term in single-seat constituencies, 4 members elected at-large and 2 ex officio members. The suffrage is from 18 years. Anguilla has a multi-party system.

== Judicial branch ==
The courts of Anguilla are:

- The Judicial Committee of the Privy Council in London; this is Anguilla's final appeal court.
- The Eastern Caribbean Supreme Court, including:
  - the Court of Appeal, and
  - the High Court, based in Anguilla.
- Anguilla's domestic courts (which enjoy appeals to the Court of Appeal), including:
  - the Magistrates' Court, and
  - the Juvenile Court.

== International relations ==
Anguilla is a member of CARICOM (associate), CDB, International Criminal Police Organization - Interpol (subbureau), OECS (associate) and ECLAC (associate).
