= 1994 Anguillian general election =

General elections were held in Anguilla on 16 March 1994. Despite a large drop in the Anguilla United Party's vote share, the loss of the Road North constituency to the Anguilla Democratic Party gave the second and third parties enough seats to form a coalition government. Hubert Hughes of the Anguilla United Party, who had stood on a pro-independence platform, was appointed Chief Minister following the elections. The small Anguilla for Good Government party replaced the Party for Anguilla's Culturisation and Economy as the fourth party, but like its predecessor, failed to win representation. The future Chief Minister Osbourne Fleming held his seat of Sandy Hill as an independent.

== Results ==
John Gumbs and David Carty were nominated to be the appointed members. However, the Speaker of the House refused to swear in Carty, leaving the post unfilled.

Party	Votes	%	Seats	+/–
Anguilla National Alliance	1,608	36.13	2	–1
Anguilla Democratic Party	1,448	32.53	2	+1
Anguilla United Party	540	12.13	2	0
Anguilla for Good Government	520	11.68	0	New
Independents	335	7.53	1	0
Appointed members			1	–1
Total	4,451	100.00	8	–1
Valid votes	4,451	96.87		
Invalid/blank votes	144	3.13		
Total votes	4,595	100.00		
Registered voters/turnout	5,980	76.84		
Source: Anguilla Elections, Caribbean Elections

=== By constituency ===
1 - Island Harbour
Party	Candidate	Votes	%	±%
ANA	Kenneth Harrigan	438	55.6	−0.6
Anguilla for Good Government	Londrane Hodge	328	41.6	N/A
Independent	Cuthwin Webster	22	2.8	N/A
Majority		110	14.0	+1.7
Turnout		788		
ANA hold		Swing	N/A	

2 - Sandy Hill
Party	Candidate	Votes	%	±%
Independent	Osbourne Fleming	250	56.6	−10.9
Anguilla for Good Government	Ronald Webster	192	43.4	N/A
Majority		58	13.1	−21.9
Turnout		442		
Independent hold		Swing	N/A	

3 - Valley North
Party	Candidate	Votes	%	±%
ANA	Eric Reid	411	50.6	−6.9
ADP	Leroy C. Rogers	402	49.4	+15.0
Majority		9	1.1	
Turnout		813		
ANA hold		Swing	-11.0	

4 - Valley South
Party	Candidate	Votes	%	±%
ADP	Victor Banks	525	61.8	−11.3
ANA	Merritt Lake	307	36.1	+2.5
AUP	Evan R. Lake	18	2.1	N/A
Majority		218	25.6	
Turnout		850		
ADP hold		Swing	-6.9	

5 - Road North
Party	Candidate	Votes	%	±%
ADP	Edison Baird	294	50.8	+8.4
ANA	David Carthy	257	44.4	−13.2
AUP	Restormel Franklin	28	4.8	N/A
Majority		37	6.4	
Turnout		579		
ADP gain from ANA		Swing	10.8	

6 -Road South
Party	Candidate	Votes	%	±%
AUP	Hubert B. Hughes	308	47.5	−6.6
ANA	Everet Romney	165	25.5	−2.6
ADP	Samuel Connor	112	17.3	+8.1
Independent	Alan Gumbs	63	9.7	N/A
Majority		143	22.1	
Turnout		648		
AUP hold		Swing	-2.0	

7 - West End
Party	Candidate	Votes	%	±%
AUP	Albert E. Hughes	186	61.8	+13.7
ADP	Kenswick Richardson	115	38.2	+14.5
Majority		71	23.6	
Turnout		301		
AUP hold		Swing		
