= House of Assembly (Anguilla) =

Unicameral legislature of Anguilla

- 12th House of Assembly

Type
- Type: Unicameral

Leadership
- Speaker: Tara Carter, AUF since 11 March 2025
- Deputy Speaker: Evans McNiel Rogers, AUF since 11 March 2025
- Premier: Cora Richardson-Hodge, AUF since 27 February 2025
- Leader of the Opposition: Ellis Webster, APM since 5 March 2025

Structure
- Seats: 13 members
- Political groups: Government (8): Anguilla United Front (8); Official Opposition (3): Anguilla Progressive Movement (3); Others (2): Ex-officio (2)

Elections
- Last election: 26 February 2025

The House of Assembly is the unicameral legislature of Anguilla. It has 13 members, 7 members in single-seat constituencies, 4 members representing the island at-large and 2 ex officio members. Anguilla has a multi-party system.

== History ==
Originally Anguilla had representation as part of the Saint Christopher-Nevis-Anguilla Legislative Council. Due to the Anguillans objecting to the union, they declared independence as the Republic of Anguilla in 1967. British control was restored in 1969. In 1976, a new constitution was issued for Anguilla by the British government which provided for a twelve member House of Assembly while they could remain a British colony. The House of Assembly would replace the preexisting seven member Legislative Council and the number in the new House were also reduced to seven elected members. It would also have two appointed members and a speaker, as well as the Attorney General of Anguilla, Chief Secretary and Financial Secretary having seats ex-officio. The first ever election to the House of Assembly in 1976 was won by Ronald Webster and his People's Progressive Party taking six of the seven seats.

An amendment of the Anguillan constitution by a British Order in Council under the Anguilla Act 1980 in 1982 would remove the Chief Secretary's automatic ex-officio seat. It was later confirmed that the House of Assembly did retain the ability to reform the electoral system without an Order in Council or amending the constitution. The House of Assembly's representation rules would later include four members appointed for Anguilla "at large". These seats would later be changed to be filled by election.

== 2020 general election ==
The members of the 12th House of Assembly were elected in the 2020 Anguillan general election.

| Party | Constituency | | | | | | At-large | | | | | Total seats | +/– |
| Party | Votes | % | candi- dates | Seats 2015 | Seats | +/– | Votes | % | candi- dates | Seats | +/– | Total seats | +/– |
|---|---|---|---|---|---|---|---|---|---|---|---|---|---|
| Anguilla Progressive Movement | 3,689 | 51.32 | 7 | 0 | 4 | ▲4 | 11,971 | 42.82 | 4 | 3 | ▲3 | 7 | ▲7 |
| Anguilla United Front | 3,170 | 44.11 | 7 | 6 | 3 | ▼3 | 9,819 | 35.12 | 4 | 1 | ▲1 | 4 | ▼2 |
| Independents | 328 | 4.56 | 3 | 1 | 0 | ▼1 | 6,166 | 22.06 | 7 | 0 | ±0 | 0 | ▼1 |
| Total | 7,187 | 100,00 | 17 | 7 | 7 | ±0 | 27,956 | 100,00 | 15 | 4 | New | 11 | ▲4 |
Source: elections.gov.ai

=== By constituency ===
| Constituency | APM candidate | Votes | AUF candidate | Votes | Independent candidate | Votes |
|---|---|---|---|---|---|---|
| 1 – Island Harbour | Ellis Lorenzo Webster | 493 | Oris Smith | 336 | Palmavon Webster | 167 |
| 2 – Sandy Hill | Jerome Roberts | 302 | Cora Richardson-Hodge | 318 | | |
| 3 – Valley North | Courtney Morton | 657 | Evans McNeil Rogers | 697 | | |
| 4 – Valley South | Dee-Ann Kentish-Rogers | 861 | Victor Banks | 755 | | |
| 5 – Road North | Merrick Richardson | 386 | Evalie Bradley | 238 | Rommel Hughes | 89 |
| 6 – Road South | Haydn Hughes | 727 | Curtis Richardson | 540 | | |
| 7 – West End | Kimberley Fleming | 263 | Cardigan Connor | 286 | Jamie Hodge | 72 |
| At-large (4 seats) | Kyle Hodge | 3,557 | Jose Vanterpool | 2,983 | Lanny Hobson | 1,643 |
| At-large (4 seats) | Kenneth Hodge | 2,917 | Othlyn Vanterpool | 2,420 | Aunika Lake | 1,532 |
| At-large (4 seats) | Quincia Gumbs-Marie | 2,840 | Lockhart Hughes | 2,290 | Brent Davis | 1,117 |
| At-large (4 seats) | Kennedy Hodge | 2,657 | Mark Romney | 2,126 | Sutcliffe Hodge | 1,016 |
| At-large (4 seats) | | | | | Glenneva Hodge | 609 |
| At-large (4 seats) | | | | | Elkin Richardson | 148 |
| At-large (4 seats) | Merlyn Duncan | 101 | | | | |

== See also ==
- List of speakers of the Anguilla House of Assembly
