= Cora Richardson-Hodge =

Anguillan politician

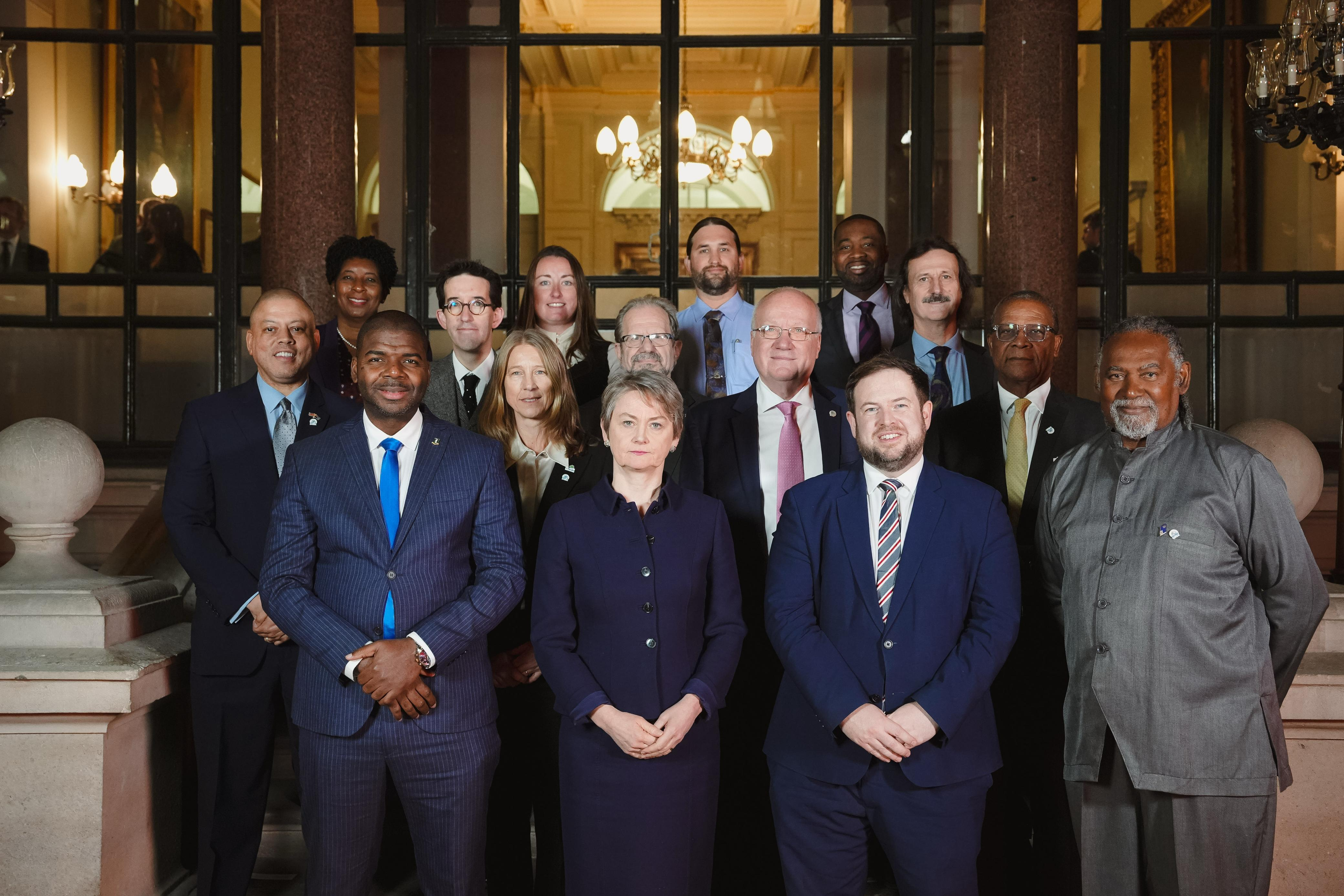
- Cora Richardson-Hodge in 2025.

3rd Premier of Anguilla
- Incumbent
- Assumed office 27 February 2025
- Monarch: Charles III
- Governor: Julia Crouch
- Preceded by: Ellis Webster

House of Assembly for Sandy Hill
- Incumbent
- Assumed office 2015

Personal details
- Born: Saint Thomas, U.S. Virgin Islands, U.S.
- Party: Anguilla United Front
- Children: 2
- Education: Florida Institute of Technology (BS); Stetson University College of Law (JD); Eugene Dupuch Law School (LEC)

Cora Richardson-Hodge is an Anguillan politician who has been the Premier of Anguilla since 2025, and a member of the House of Assembly for Sandy Hill since 2015. She is the leader of the Anguilla United Front. She is the first woman to serve as Premier of Anguilla and was among the first women elected to the House of Assembly since 1984.

== Early life and education ==
Cora Richardson-Hodge was born in Saint Thomas, U.S. Virgin Islands, to Kenneth Richardson and Doris Connor-Richardson. Her parents were born in Anguilla, but moved to the U.S. Virgin Islands. She graduated from Charlotte Amalie High School.

Richardson-Hodge graduated with a bachelor of science in environmental science from the Florida Institute of Technology in 1995, a Juris Doctor from Stetson University College of Law in 1999, and a Legal Education Certificate from Eugene Dupuch Law School in 2001. The Eastern Caribbean Supreme Court trained her as a mediator.

== Career ==
The Florida Bar admitted Richardson-Hodge in 1999, the bar associations of Anguilla and the U.S. Virgin Islands in 2001, and the bar association of St. Christopher and Nevis in 2002. She moved to Anguilla and worked as an attorney, founding the firm CR Hodge & Associates.

In the 2010 Anguillian general election Richardson-Hodge was the Anguilla United Front (AUF) nominee for a seat in the House of Assembly from the East End, but lost. She was elected from the Sandy Hill constituency in 2015. She, alongside Evalie A. Bradley and Palmavon Webster, were the first women elected to the House of Assembly since Abena Lake-Hodge in 1984.

Richardson-Hodge was Minister of Home Affairs. She was the deputy leader of the AUF before becoming its leader and Leader of the Opposition in the House of Assembly on 3 July 2020. The AUF won a majority of House of Assembly seats in the 2025 general election. Richardson-Hodge was sworn in as the first female premier of Anguilla on 27 February 2025.

== Personal life ==
Richardson-Hodge is married and has two children.

== Works cited ==
=== News ===
- Bird, Rebecca (27 February 2025). "Cora Richardson Hodge sworn in as Anguilla's first female premier". Anguilla Focus. Archived from the original on 17 June 2025.
- Smith, Sheridan (27 February 2025). "Cora Richardson Hodge sworn in as Anguilla's first female premier". The Anguillian Newspaper. Archived from the original on 14 March 2022.
- "Former AUF Minister Now Opposition Leader". The Anguillian. 6 July 2020. Archived from the original on 17 June 2025.

=== Web ===
- "Cora Richardson-Hodge". Caribbean Elections. Archived from the original on 17 May 2022.
