= Anguilla Strategic Alliance =

The Anguilla Strategic Alliance is a political party in Anguilla. At the 2005 Anguillian general election, the party ran 4 candidates, winning 19% of the popular vote and 2 out of 7 elected seats.

== Electoral results ==
Leader	Votes	%	Seats	+/–	Position	Government
2005	1,076	19.3	2 / 7	▲2	▲2nd	Opposition
