= Ellis Webster =

Anguillan politician and physician

The Honourable Ellis Webster MHA
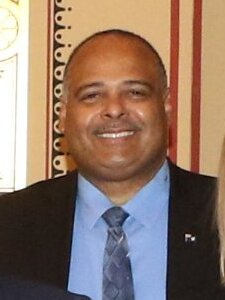
- Ellis Webster in 2021

Leader of the Opposition
- Incumbent
- Assumed office 5 March 2025
- Monarch: Charles III
- Premier: Cora Richardson-Hodge
- Governor: Julia Crouch
- Preceded by: Cora Richardson-Hodge

2nd Premier of Anguilla
- In office 30 June 2020 – 27 February 2025
- Monarchs: Elizabeth II; Charles III
- Governor: Tim Foy; Dileeni Daniel-Selvaratnam; Julia Crouch
- Preceded by: Victor Banks
- Succeeded by: Cora Richardson-Hodge

Personal details
- Born: Ellis Lorenzo Webster; 25 March 1963 (age 62) Island Harbour, Anguilla
- Party: Progressive Movement
- Education: University of the Virgin Islands; Yale School of Medicine

Ellis Lorenzo Webster (born 25 March 1963) is an Anguillan politician and physician. He is the former premier of the British Overseas Territory of Anguilla and current Leader of the Opposition, first elected when he led the Anguilla Progressive Movement to victory in the general election held on 29 June 2020.

== Biography ==
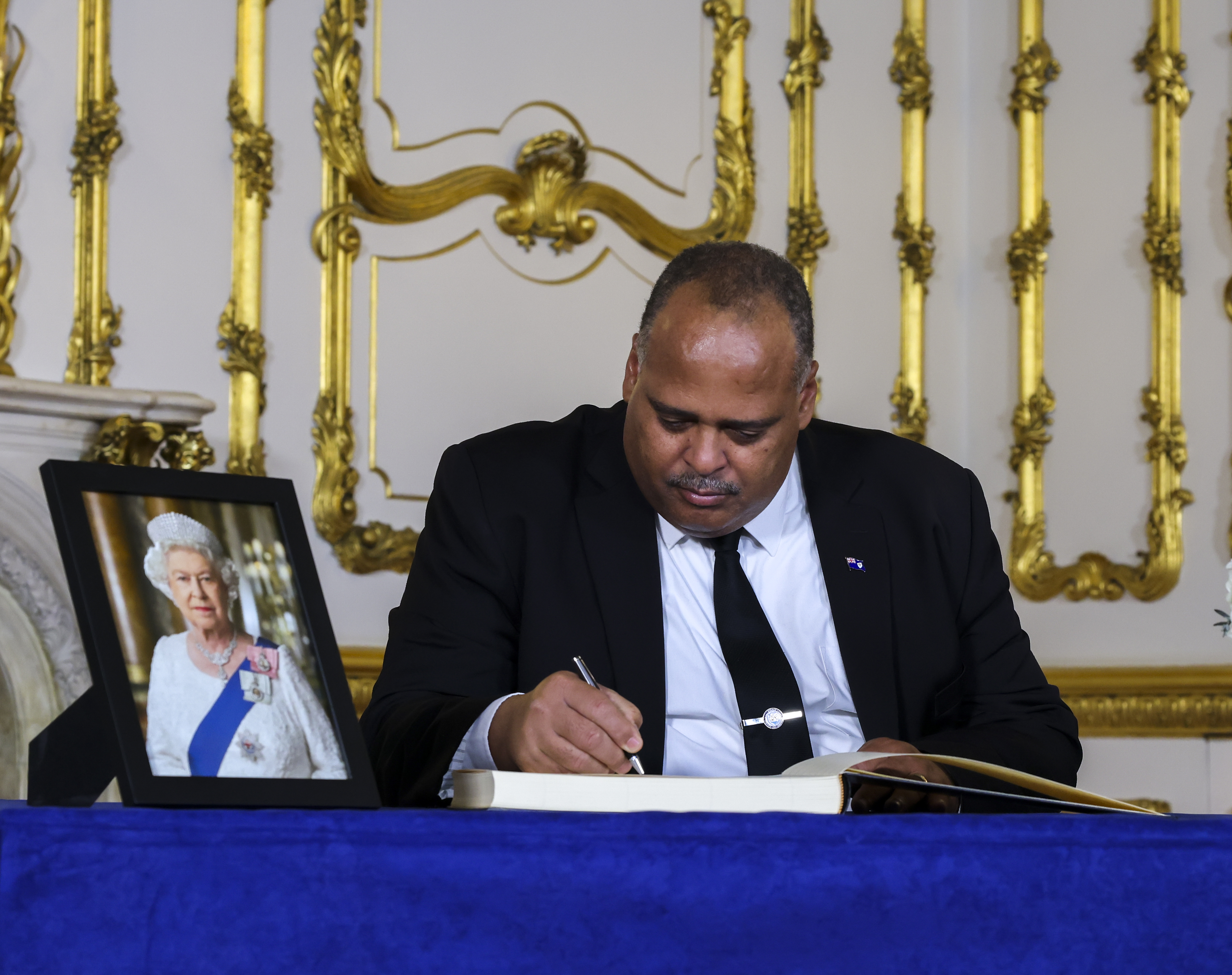
Webster signing the book of condolence for Queen Elizabeth II at Lancaster House on 17 September 2022

Webster was born on Island Harbour. Initially he studied dental therapy. In 1986, Webster graduated from University of the Virgin Islands in biology. In 1991, he graduated from Yale University School of Medicine, and specialised in Otorhinolaryngology at the University of Iowa.

Webster first practised in Florida. Around 2000, he returned to Anguilla. In 2020, he was elected premier of Anguilla.

His wife is named Marjorie Webster and they have two children, Rachel and Colin Webster.
