= Anguilla Progressive Party =

- Ideology: Conservatism; Democratic liberalism
- Political position: Centre-right
- Colors: orange
- House of Assembly: 0 / 11

The Anguilla Progressive Party (APP) is a political party in Anguilla. The APP took part in the 2005 and 2010 Anguilla general election.

In 2005, Brent Davis ran as the leader of the APP. Although the party did not win any seats, they won 8.92% of the total vote.

Brent Davis also ran in 2010, during which the APP managed to obtain one seat by receiving 53.46% of the votes in the Sandy Hill District and 14.71% of the total votes.

== Electoral results ==
| Leader | Votes | % | Seats | +/– | Position | Government |
|---|---|---|---|---|---|---|
| 2005 | 497 | 8.9 | 0 / 7 | 0 | ▲4th | Opposition |
| 2010 | 1,039 | 14.7 | 1 / 7 | ▲1 | ▲3rd | Opposition |
