= Anguilla Democratic Party =

The Anguilla Democratic Party was a political party in Anguilla. It was led by Camile Connor in 1976. At the 2005 Anguillian general election, the party became part of the Anguilla United Front, which won 39% of the popular vote and four out of seven elected seats.

== Electoral results ==
Leader	Votes	%	Seats	+/–	Position	Government
1989	934	25.2	1 / 7	▲1	▲3rd	Opposition
1994	1,348	31.0	2 / 7	▲1	▲2nd	Coalition
1999	1,579	32.9	2 / 7	0	2nd	Coalition
2000	536	11.4	1 / 7	▼1	▼3rd	Coalition
