= Anguilla National Alliance =

The Anguilla National Alliance was a centre-right political party in Anguilla, formed in 1980 by breaking away from the People's Progressive Party. They won one seat at the 1980 Anguillian general election, with the Anguilla United Movement winning the rest. At the 2005 Anguillian general election, the party first became part of the Anguilla United Front (AUF), that won 38.9% of popular votes and 4 out of 7 elected seats, and became a part of the AUF since then.

The party was a member of the Caribbean Democrat Union.

== Electoral results ==
Leader	Votes	%	Seats	+/–	Position	Government
1980			1 / 7	▲1	▲2nd	Opposition
1981			1 / 7	0	2nd	Opposition
1984		53.8	4 / 7	▲3	▲1st	Majority
1989	1,510	40.8	3 / 7	▼1	1st	Coalition
1994	1,608	37.0	2 / 7	▼1	1st	Opposition
1999	2,054	42.8	3 / 7	▲1	1st	Opposition
2000	1,684	35.8	3 / 7	0	1st	Coalition
