= Anguilla Progressive Movement =

- Leader: Ellis Webster
- Founder: Ronald Webster
- Founded: Early 1980 as the Anguilla United Movement
- Ideology: Liberalism; Progressivism
- Political position: Centre-left
- Colors: (since 2019) (before 2019)
- UK affiliation: none
- House of Assembly: 3 / 13

Website
- https://www.voteapm.com/

The Anguilla Progressive Movement (APM) is a political party in Anguilla. The party was named the Anguilla United Movement (AUM) until being rebranded in 2019 alongside new leaders and colours. It was founded in early 1980 by Ronald Webster and "his former political rivals", Hubert Hughes and Colonel Claudius Roberts. Under various names, it was originally a vehicle for Ronald Webster and his supporters.

== Electoral results ==
Election	Votes	%	Seats	+/–	Position	Government
1976 as the People's Progressive Party (PPP)			6 / 7	▲6	▲1st	Majority
1980 as the Anguilla United Movement (AUM)			6 / 7	0	1st	Majority
1981 as the Anguilla People's Party (APP)			5 / 7	0	1st	Majority
1984 as the Anguilla People's Party (APP)		41.7	2 / 7	▼4	▼2nd	Opposition
1989 as the Anguilla United Party (AUP)	824	22.3	2 / 7	0	2nd	Opposition
1994 as the Anguilla United Party (AUP)	540	12.4	2 / 7	0	2nd	Coalition
1999 as the Anguilla United Party (AUP)	704	14.7	2 / 7	0	2nd	Coalition
2000 as the Anguilla United Movement (AUM)	596	12.5	2 / 7	0	2nd	Opposition
2005 as the Anguilla United Movement (AUM)	1,088	19.5	1 / 7	▼1	▼3rd	Opposition
2010 as the Anguilla United Movement (AUM)	2,308	32.7	4 / 7	▲3	▲1st	Majority
2015 as the Anguilla United Movement (AUM)	3,039	38.3	0 / 7	▼4	▼2nd	Opposition
2020	15,660	44.5	7 / 11	▲7	▲1st	Majority
2025	16219	43.9	3 / 11	▼4	▲2nd	Opposition

== See also ==
- Category:Anguilla Progressive Movement politicians
- People's Progressive Party (Anguilla)
