= Anguilla United Front =

- Leader: Cora Richardson-Hodge
- Founded: 7 January 2000
- Ideology: Conservative liberalism
- Political position: Centre to centre-right
- Colors: (since 2020) (before 2020)
- House of Assembly: 8 / 13

The Anguilla United Front (AUF) is an alliance of political parties in Anguilla. The AUF was created on 7 January 2000 as a political and electoral partnership, when an agreement, The United Front Agreement, was signed by the Chairmen and Political Leaders of the Anguilla National Alliance and the Anguilla Democratic Party, on behalf of the executive and rank and file members of the two parties. The full title of the United Front Partnership as set out in the Agreement is United Front for the Restoration of Democracy, Good Governance, Peace, Political Stability and Economic Prosperity to Anguilla.

The AUF, under the political leadership of Osbourne Fleming, presented itself to the Anguilla electorate as a partnership in the campaign for the general elections held shortly thereafter, not as a traditional coalition of two political parties to contest elections.

Old logo

The AUF, when it took over the reins of the Anguilla Government in 2000, brought to the administration of the Government of Anguilla considerable experience gained from the participation of its elected leadership in various governments dating back to 1981. In 2000, the AUF ministers who formed the Government following the February elections had between them at least 35 years of service as ministers in various Anguilla Governments.

== Electoral results ==
Election	Votes	%	Seats	+/–	Position	Government
2000	2,220	46.7	4 / 7	▲4	▲1st	Majority
2005	2,177	39.1	4 / 7	0	1st	Majority
2010	2,781	39.4	2 / 7	▼2	▼2nd	Opposition
2015	4,324	54.4	6 / 7	▲4	▲1st	Majority
2020	12,990	36.6	4 / 11	▼2	▼2nd	Opposition
2025	18,267	49.5	8 / 11	▲4	▲1st	Majority
