= List of colonial governors and administrators of Anguilla =

There have been many colonial governors of Anguilla. The official title of the position began as Deputy Governor of Anguilla, which transitioned to Chief Magistrate of Anguilla, and then became the current title of Governor of Anguilla.

== Deputy Governors ==
1. William Watts 1660–1666
2. Abraham Howell 1666–1689
3. George Leonard 1689–1735
4. John Richardson 1735–1741
5. Arthur Hodge 1741–1749
6. John Welch 1749–1750
7. Benjamin Gumbs II 1750–1768
8. Benjamin Roberts 1768–1771
9. John Smith 1771–1776
10. Benjamin Gumbs III 1776–1782
11. Thomas Hodge 1782–1805
12. William Richardson 1805–1829

== Chief Magistrates ==
1. Richard Challenger 1842–1846
2. Isidor Dyett 1862–1863
3. George Alsbury 26 November 1863 – 28 January 1868
4. Alexander Augustus Melfort Campbell (1827–1890) January 1868 – February 1869
5. Neale Porter March 1869 – May 1871
6. D.S. Lloyd c. 1873
7. James L. Lake c. 1879–1882
8. Edwin Baynes 1888
9. N. Lockhart c. 1896
10. Joseph Numa Rat 1897 – c. 1904
11. G.B. Mason c. 1905
12. Alan Cuthbert Burns 1910–1912
13. W.E. Burton 1913
14. G.I. Mendes c. 1913–1915
15. W.E. Burton (second time) 1917–1918
16. S.B. Jones 9 August 1918 – 31 May 1923
17. J.Y. MacFadyen c. 1926–1933
18. C.E.E. Stevens c. 1937–1938
19. A.P. McDonald c. 1939–1948
20. J.D. Maloney (1905–?) c. 1952–1958
21. G.C.H. Thomas (1911–?) c. 1958–1962
22. Vincent F. Byron 1962 – 31 May 1967
23. Peter Adams July 1967 – 23 February 1968

== Governors ==
1. Charles Henry Godden 1982–1983
2. Alastair Turner Baillie 1983–1987
3. Geoffrey Owen Whittaker 1987–1989
4. Brian G.J. Canty 1989–1992
5. Alan W. Shave 1992–1995
6. Alan Hoole 1995–1996
7. Robert Harris (born 1941) December 1996 – 27 January 2000
8. Roger Cousins (acting) 2000
9. Peter Johnstone (born 1944) 4 February 2000 – 29 April 2004
10. Mark Capes (acting) 2004
11. Alan Huckle 28 May 2004 – July 2006
12. Mark Capes (acting) 2006
13. Andrew George 10 July 2006 – 11 March 2009
14. Stanley Reid (acting) 11 March 2009 – 21 April 2009
15. Alistair Harrison 21 April 2009 – 18 July 2013
16. Stanley Reid (acting) 18 July 2013 – 23 July 2013
17. Christina Scott 23 July 2013 – 17 August 2017
18. Perin Bradley (acting) 17 August 2017 – 21 August 2017
19. Tim Foy 21 August 2017 – 30 December 2020
20. Perin Bradley (acting) 30 December 2020 – 18 Jan 2021
21. Dileeni Daniel-Selvaratnam 18 Jan 2021 – 1 June 2023
22. Perin Bradley (acting) 1 June 2023 – 26 June 2023
23. Paul Candler (acting) 26 June 2023 – 11 September 2023
24. Julia Crouch 11 September 2023 – present
