= Gumbs =

Gumbs is a surname. It derives from the Old Norse name Gunnr (alternatively Guðr ).

Notable people with the name include:

- Alexis Pauline Gumbs (born 1982), American writer and educator
- Benjamin Gumbs II (died 1768), British colonial governor
- Benjamin Gumbs III, British colonial governor and plantation owner
- Sir Emile Gumbs (1928–2018), Anguillan politician
- Frantz Gumbs (born 1954), French Saint Martinois politician
- George Gumbs Jr. (born 2002), American football player
- Godfrey Gumbs, professor of theoretical solid state physics
- Jermaine Gumbs (born 1986), Anguillan international soccer player
- Keith Gumbs (born 1972), St. Kitts and Nevis international soccer player
- Marcel Gumbs (born 1953), 2nd Prime Minister of Sint Maarten
- Melissa Gumbs, Sint Maarten politician
- Onaje Allan Gumbs, (1949–2020), American pianist, composer and bandleader
- Philip N. Gumbs (1923–2005), American politician
- Roy Gumbs (born 1969), Anguillan international soccer player
- Roy Gumbs (boxer) (born 1954), Saint Kitts and Nevis boxer of the 1970s, '80s and '90s
- Walford Gumbs (born ca. 1948-1950), Saint Kitts and Nevis politician and trade unionist

== See also ==
- Quincia Gumbs-Marie Anguillian politician and environmentalist
