= Jermaine =

- Pronunciation: /dʒərˈmeɪn/ jər-MAYN
- Gender: Male

Origin
- Origin: Latin

Other names
- Related names: Germain, Germaine

Jermaine (/dʒərˈmeɪn/ jər-MAYN) is a masculine given name of Latin origin, derived from the French given name Germain, which is in turn derived from the Latin given name Germanus.

The masculine given name Jermaine was popularized in the 1970s by Jermaine Jackson (born 1954), a member of the singing group The Jackson 5.

Jermaine ranked among the top 200 names given to boys born in the United States between 1960 and 1980. It has since declined in popularity and was ranked as the 738th most popular name for American males born in 2013. It is considered to be an African-American name.

== People ==
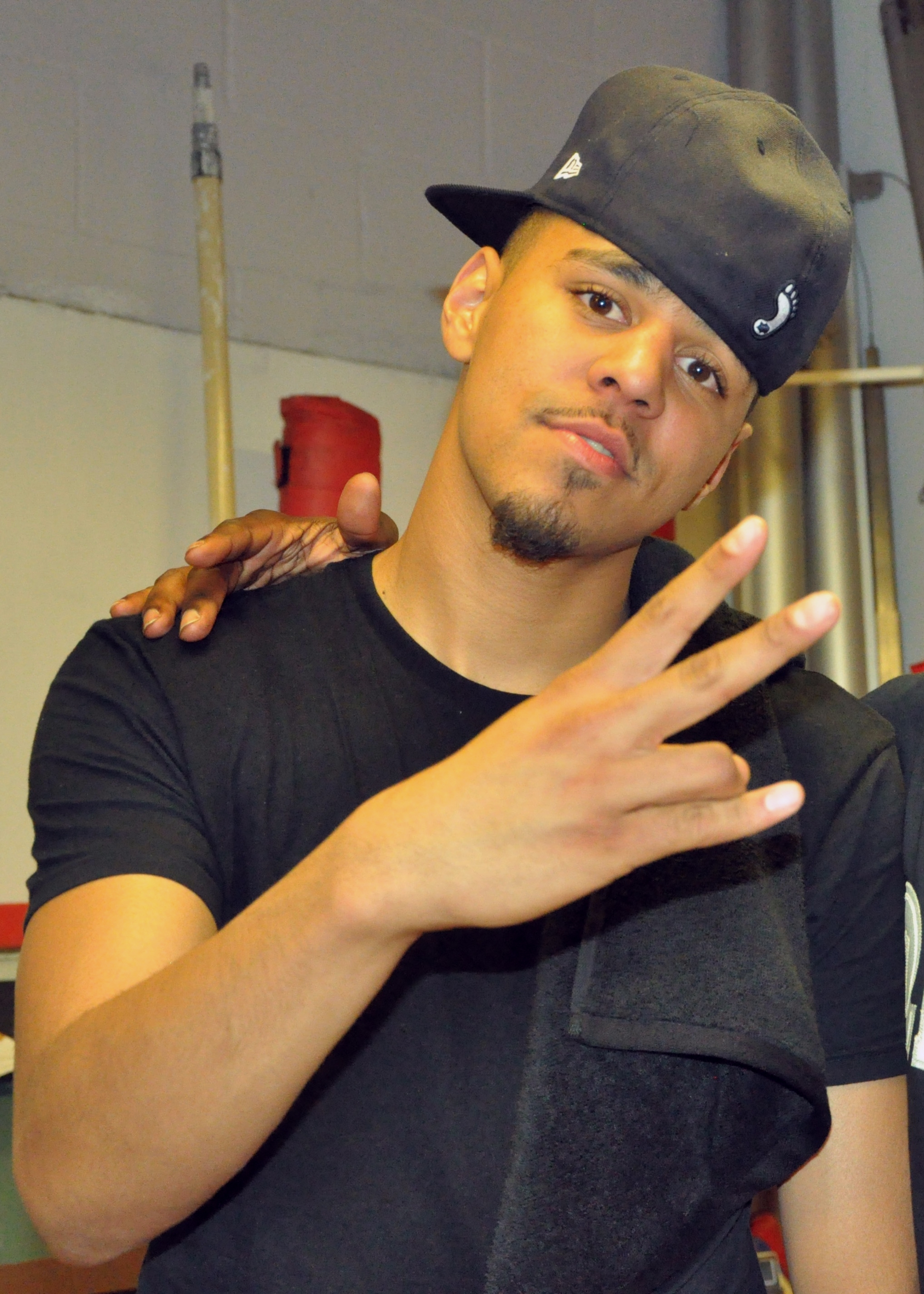
Jermaine Cole

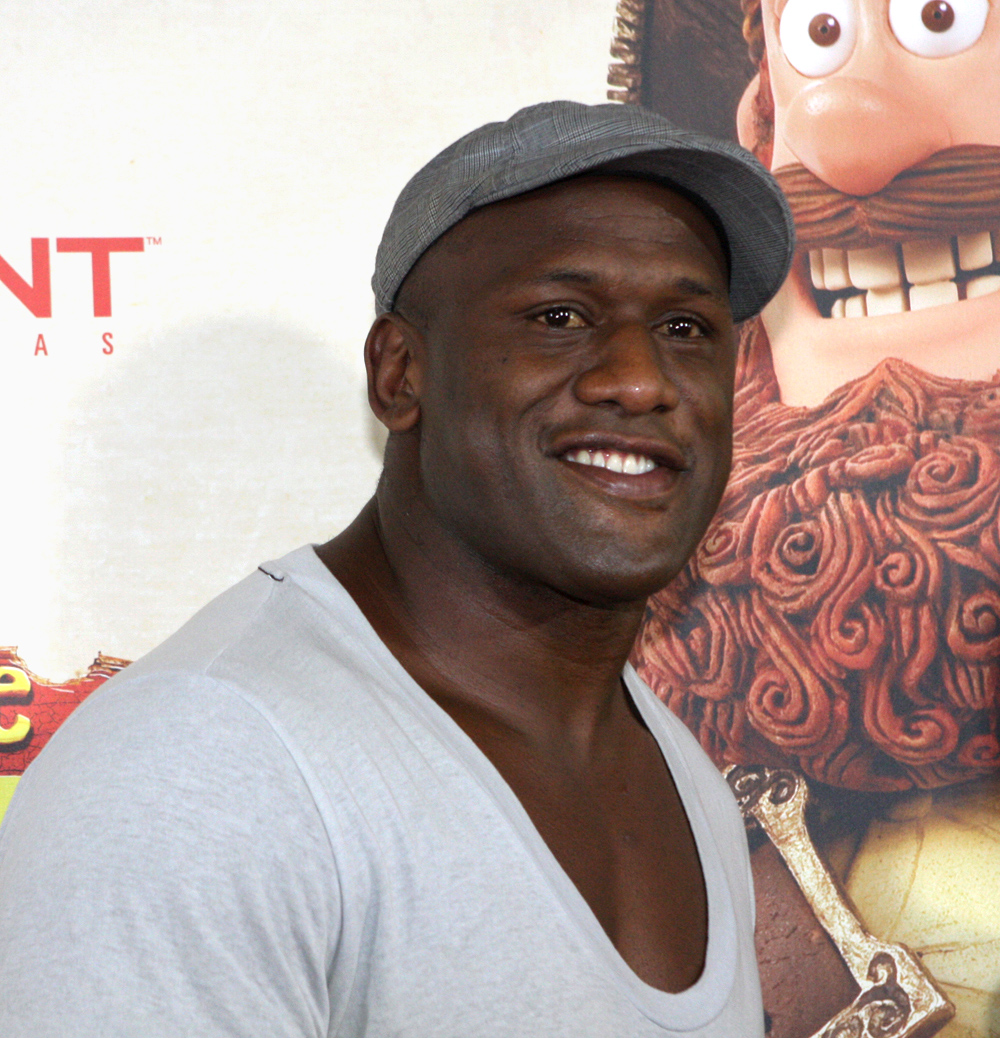
W. Jermaine Sailor

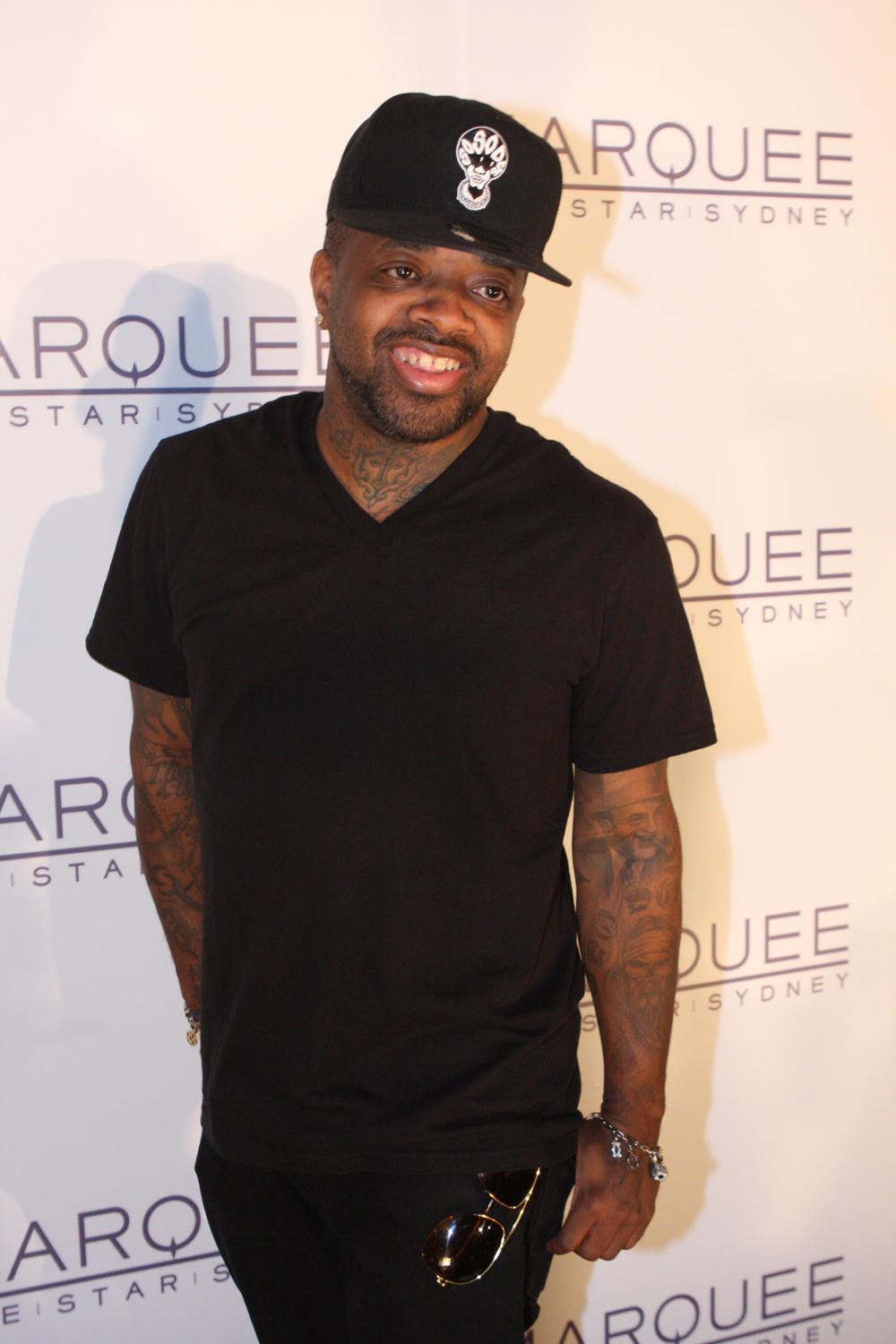
Jermaine Dupri

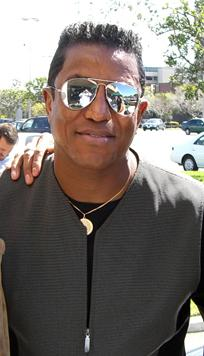
Jermaine Jackson

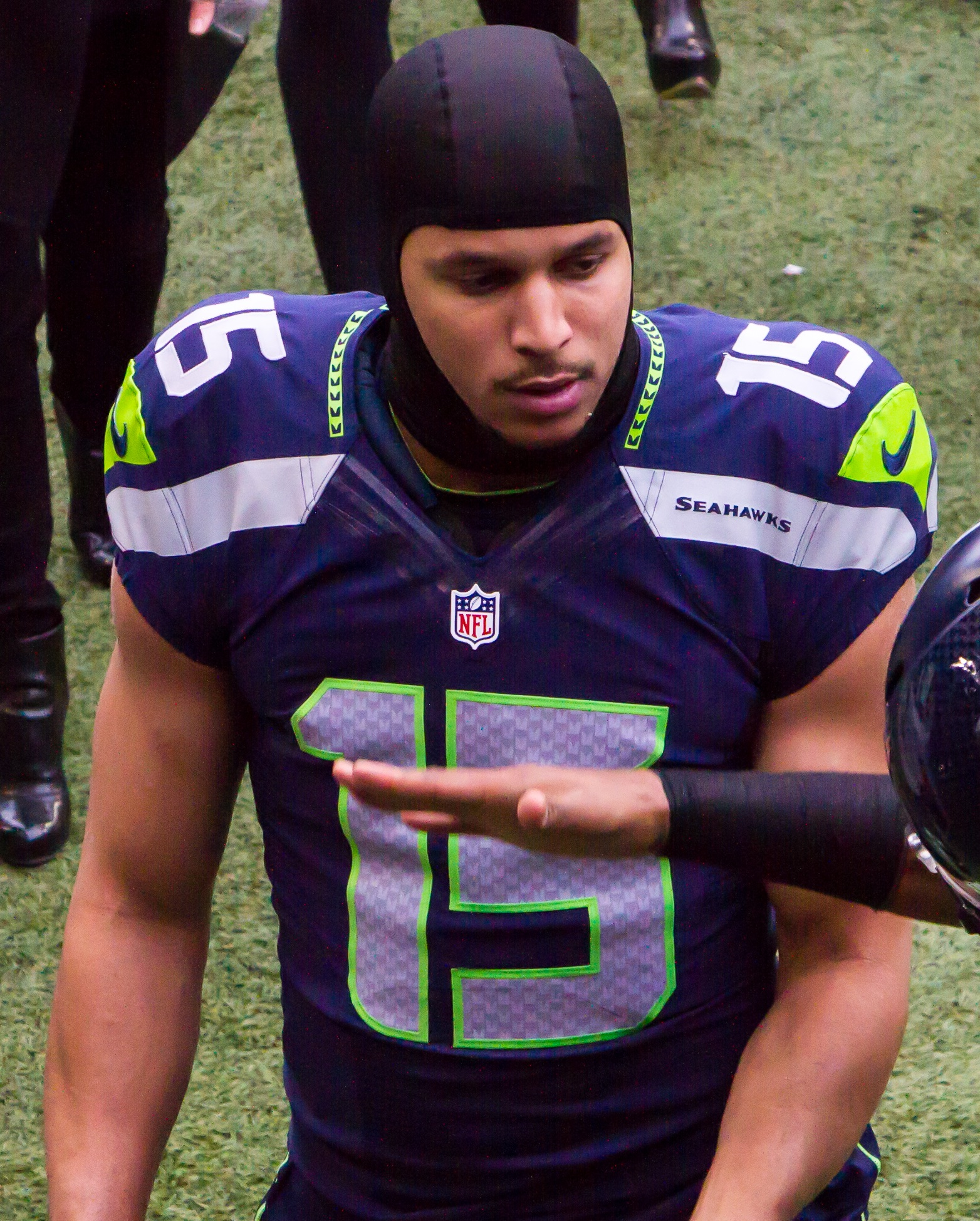
Jermaine Kearse

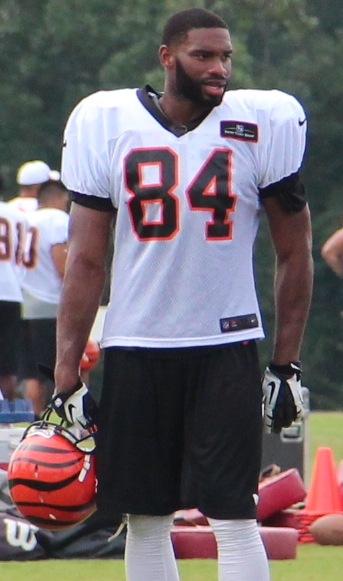
Jermaine Gresham

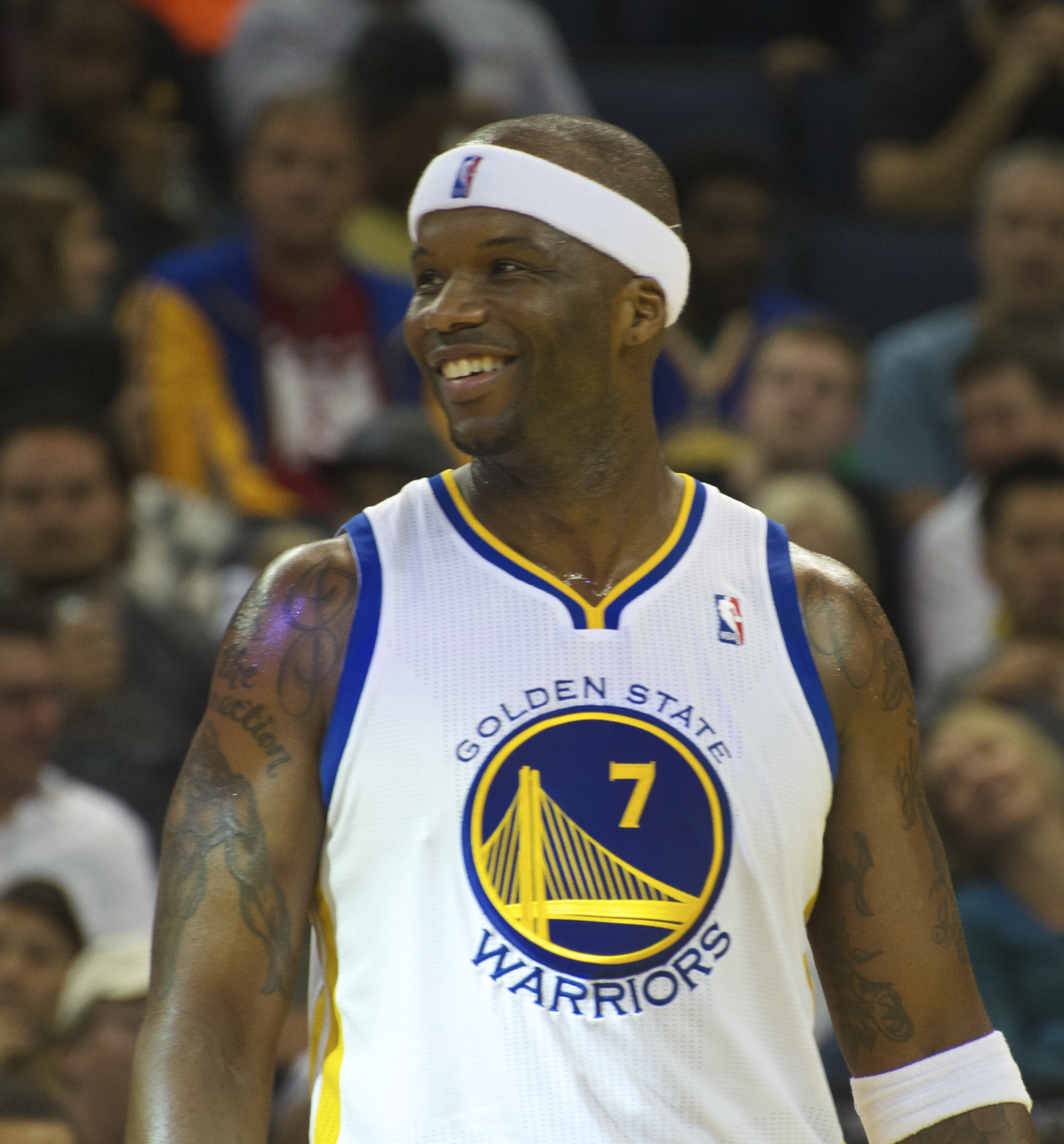
Jermaine O'Neal

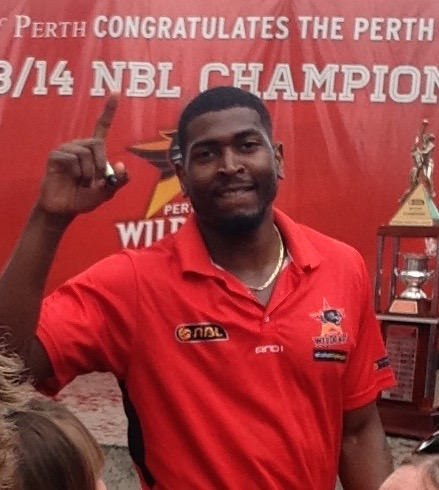
Jermaine Beal

- Jermaine Ale (born 1985), Australian rugby league player
- Jermaine Allensworth (born 1972), American baseball player
- Jermaine Anderson (born 1983), Canadian basketball player
- Jermaine Anderson (English footballer) (born 1996), English footballer
- Jermaine Anderson (Jamaican footballer) (born 1979), Jamaican footballer
- Jermaine Beal (born 1987), American basketball player
- Jermaine Beckford (born 1983), Jamaican footballer
- Jermaine Bishop (born 1997), American basketball player
- Jermaine Bishop Jr. (born 2008), American football player
- Jermaine Blackburn (born 1983), American basketball player
- Jermaine Blackwood (born 1991), Jamaican cricketer
- Jermaine Brown (athlete) (born 1991), Jamaican sprinter
- Jermaine Brown (footballer born 1983) (born 1983), English footballer
- Jermaine Brown (footballer born 1985) (born 1985), Caymanian football goalkeeper
- Jermaine Bucknor (born 1983), Canadian basketball player
- Jermaine Burton (born 2001), American football player
- Jermaine Carter (born 1995), American football player
- Jermaine Clark (born 1976), American baseball player
- Jemaine Clement (born 1974), New Zealander folk musician and comedian, part of the duo Flight of the Conchords.
- Jermaine Cole (known as J. Cole for short); (born 1985), American rapper, music producer, songwriter, official recording artist for Roc Nation.
- Jermaine Couisnard (born 1998), American basketball player
- Jermaine Crawford (born 1992), American actor
- Jermaine Cunningham (born 1988), American football outside linebacker
- Jermaine Curtis (born 1987), American baseball player
- Jermaine Darlington (born 1974), English footballer
- Jermain Defoe (born 1982), English footballer
- Jermaine Dupri (born 1972), American music producer, rapper and Grammy winning songwriter
- Jermaine Dye (born 1974), American baseball player
- Jermaine Easter (born 1982), Welsh footballer
- Jermaine Eluemunor (born 1994), British-American football player
- Jermaine Fagan (born 1978), Jamaican musician
- Jermaine Fazande (born 1975), American football running back
- Jermaine Gabriel (born 1990), Canadian football defensive back
- Jermaine Gonsalves (born 1976), British basketball player
- Jermaine Gonzales (born 1984), Jamaican runner
- Jermaine Grandison (born 1990), English footballer
- Jermaine Gresham (born 1988), American football tight end
- Jermaine Gumbs (born 1986), Anguillan footballer
- Jermaine Haley (born 1973), American football defensive tackle
- Jermaine Hall (born 1980), American basketball player for Maccabi Ashdod of the Israeli Basketball Premier League
- Jermaine Hardy (born 1982), American football defensive back
- Jermaine Hollis (born 1986), English footballer
- Jermaine Holwyn (born 1973), Dutch footballer
- Jermaine Hopkins (born 1973), American actor
- Jermaine Hue (born 1978), Jamaican footballer
- Jermaine Jackman (born 1995), English singer
- Jermaine Jackson (born 1954), American musician
- Jermaine Jackson (basketball) (born 1976), American basketball player
- Jermaine Jackson (born 1982), Canadian football wide receiver
- Jermaine Jenas (born 1983), English footballer
- Jermaine Johnson (born 1980), Jamaican footballer
- Jermaine Jones (born 1981), American footballer
- Jermaine Jones (American football) (born 1976), American Arena Football League player
- Jermaine Jones (singer) (born 1986), American singer, and actor
- Jermaine Joseph (born 1980), Canadian sprinter
- Jermaine Kearse (born 1990), American football player
- Jermaine Kelly (born 1995), American football player
- Jermaine Lawson (born 1982), Jamaican cricketer
- Jermaine Lewis (disambiguation), multiple people
- Jermaine Mathews Jr. (born 2005), American football player
- Jermaine Mays (born 1979), American football cornerback, and Canadian football cornerback
- Jermaine McElveen (born 1984), Canadian football defensive end
- Jermaine McGhee (born 1983), American football defensive end
- Jermaine McGillvary (born 1988), English rugby league footballer
- Jermaine McGlashan (born 1988), English footballer
- Jermaine McSporran (born 1977), English footballer
- Jermaine O'Neal (born 1978), American basketball player
- Jermaine Palmer (born 1986), English footballer
- Jermaine Paul (born 1978), American singer
- Jermaine Pennant (born 1983), English footballer
- Jermaine Phillips (born 1979), American football safety
- Jermaine Post (born 1992), Dutch cycle racer
- Jermaine Reid (born 1983), Canadian football defensive tackle
- Jermaine Rogers (born 1972), American artist, and designer
- Jermaine Ross (born 1971), American football player
- W. Jermaine Sailor (born 1974), Australian dual-code rugby international
- Jermaine Sandvliet (born 1977), Dutch footballer
- Jermaine Sinclair (known as Wretch 32 for stage name); (born 1985), English rapper
- Jermaine Smith (born 1972), American Arena Football League player
- Jermaine Stewart (1957–1997), American singer
- Jermain Taylor (born 1978), American boxer
- Jermaine Taylor (basketball) (born 1986), American basketball player
- Jermaine Taylor (footballer) (born 1985), Jamaican footballer
- Jermaine Terry II (born 2003), American football player
- Jermaine Thomas (born 1990), Canadian football running back
- Jermaine Thomas (basketball) (born 1984), American basketball player
- Jermaine Turner (born 1974), American basketball player
- Jermaine Van Buren (born 1980), American baseball player
- Jermaine van Pijkeren (born 1991), Dutch footballer
- Jermaine Walker (1977–2024), American basketball player
- Jermaine Warner (born 1971), Bermudian cricketer
- Jermaine Whitehead (born 1993), American football player
- Jermaine Wiggins (born 1975), American football player
- Jermaine Williams (born 1982), American actor, and dancer
- Jermaine Williams (American football) (born 1973), American football running back
- Jermaine Woozencroft (born 1992), Jamaican footballer
- Jermaine Wright (born 1975), English footballer

== Fictional characters ==
- Jermaine, a character who is Finn the Human and Jake the Dog's brother in the TV series Adventure Time
