= Barbara Webster-Bourne =

Anguillan politician

The Honourable Barbara Webster-Bourne MHA

Speaker of the House of Assembly
- In office 17 July 2020 – 29 January 2025
- Monarchs: Elizabeth II; Charles III
- Governor: Tim Foy; Dileeni Daniel-Selvaratnam
- Preceded by: Terry Harrigan
- Succeeded by: Tara Carter
- In office 27 February 2010 – 11 May 2015
- Monarch: Elizabeth II
- Governor: Alistair Harrison
- Preceded by: David Carty
- Succeeded by: Leroy Rogers

Personal details
- Born: Anguilla
- Occupation: Politician, teacher

Barbara Webster-Bourne is an Anguillan politician. She served as Speaker of the Anguilla House of Assembly from 17 July 2020 to 29 January 2025. She also held the post between 27 February 2010 and 11 May 2015

== Career ==
She ran on three occasions for the Island Harbour constituency. First for the Anguilla Democratic Party in the 1999 general election and then as an independent candidate in both the 2000 and 2005 general elections.

Following the 2010 Anguillan general election, Webster-Bourne was voted in as the Speaker of the House of Assembly on 27 February, the first time a woman had held the post in Anguilla's history. She replaced outgoing speaker David Carty. The Governor of Anguilla, Alistair Harrison, said of her appointment, "I believe that she holds one of the most difficult jobs in Anguilla and I wish her well in her important duties."

In 2012, she admonished the Deputy Speaker of the House of Assembly, Leroy Rogers, after he criticised her publicly on Radio Anguilla. He claimed that during the passage of the Vehicles and Road Traffic Amendment Bill 2011, that Webster-Bourne should have had no opinion on whether one of the offences proposed should have been included. She reminded him that the office of speaker is non-political, but under the Anguilla Constitution Order 1982 she has such rights.

In the following year, she had a public falling out with members of the opposition party who accused of not remaining neutral and allowing the ruling party the ability to legislate how they wished. She responded with a public letter published in The Anguillian, to which they said that they would place a motion of no-confidence in her within the House of Assembly. This was all part of an ongoing unrest between Webster-Bourne and the opposition party, whose leader, Evans McNiel Rogers, she had removed from the chamber on multiple occasions. Following the 2015 Anguillan general election, Webster-Bourne was replaced by her deputy, Leroy Rogers, as speaker on 11 May 2015.
