= 2005 CONCACAF U-20 Tournament squads =

The 2005 CONCACAF U-20 Tournament was an eight nation competition arranged to decide which four nations were to qualify for the 2005 FIFA U-20 World Cup.

Each team registered 18 players.

== Group A ==
=== Costa Rica ===
Head coach: (Costa Rica) Carlos Watson

No.	Pos.	Player	Date of birth (age)	Caps	Club
1	GK	Daniel Cambronero	8 January 1986 (aged 19)		(Costa Rica) Deportivo Saprissa
3	FW	Sebastian Sequeira	31 December 1985 (aged 19)		(Costa Rica) Libertad
4	MF	Esteban Granados	25 October 1985 (aged 19)		(Costa Rica) Cartagines
5	MF	Jose Luis Cordero	31 January 1987 (aged 17)		(Costa Rica) Deportivo Saprissa
6	MF	Greivin Arce	25 February 1985 (aged 19)		(Costa Rica) San Carlos
7	MF	Mauricio Mora	13 March 1985 (aged 19)		(Costa Rica) U.C.R.
8	MF	Gherland McDonald	6 September 1986 (aged 18)		(Norway) Fredrikstad
10	FW	Windell Gabriel	1 February 1985 (aged 19)		(Costa Rica) U.C.R.
12	DF	Kenny Mitchel	6 September 1986 (aged 18)		(Costa Rica) Deportivo Saprissa
13	DF	Jody Steward	11 January 1985 (aged 20)		(Costa Rica) Fusion Tibas
14	DF	Jose Chan	7 August 1985 (aged 19)		(Costa Rica) Deportivo Saprissa
15	FW	Alonso Salazar	21 May 1986 (aged 18)		(Costa Rica) Santos
16	FW	Franklin Chacon	18 June 1985 (aged 19)		(Costa Rica) CS Herediano
17	DF	Cesar Carillo	14 June 1985 (aged 19)		(Costa Rica) Fusion Tibas
18	GK	Keilor Navas	15 December 1986 (aged 18)		(Costa Rica) Deportivo Saprissa
19	DF	Roberto Mudarra	14 June 1985 (aged 19)		Unattached
20	MF	Jose Garro	7 June 1986 (aged 18)		(Norway) Fredrikstad
21	FW	Kenny Cunningham	7 June 1985 (aged 19)		(Costa Rica) LD Alajuelense

=== Panama ===
Head coach: (Panama) Victor René Mendieta

No.	Pos.	Player	Date of birth (age)	Caps	Club
1	GK	José Calderón	14 August 1989 (aged 15)		(Panama) Chepo FC
2	DF	Tomas Dunn	14 August 1985 (aged 19)		Unspecified
3	DF	Armando Gun	17 January 1986 (aged 18)		(Panama) Chepo FC
4	DF	Román Torres	20 March 1986 (aged 18)		Unspecified
5	DF	Jose Venegas	20 February 1989 (aged 15)		Unspecified
6	MF	Celso Polo	19 March 1987 (aged 17)		Unspecified
7	MF	Reggie Arosemena	9 September 1986 (aged 18)		Unspecified
8	FW	Cristian Vega	2 April 1985 (aged 19)		(Panama) Tauro FC
9	FW	Edwin Aguilar	7 August 1989 (aged 15)		(Panama) San Francisco FC
10	MF	Miguel Castillo	8 November 1986 (aged 18)		(Panama) Unspecified
11	FW	David Arrue	11 April 1985 (aged 19)		Unspecified
12	GK	Leopoldo Perez	6 March 1986 (aged 18)		Unspecified
13	DF	Raul Loo	25 June 1986 (aged 18)		Unspecified
14	MF	Eduardo Ponce	29 November 1985 (aged 19)		Unspecified
15	MF	Hanamel Hill	12 March 1986 (aged 18)		(Panama) C.A. Independiente
16	DF	Luis Gallardo	27 June 1986 (aged 18)		Unspecified
17	FW	Alvaro Salazar	27 November 1985 (aged 19)		Unspecified
18	MF	Ricardo Buitrago	10 March 1986 (aged 18)		Unspecified

=== Trinidad and Tobago ===
Head coach: (Trinidad and Tobago) Anton Corneal

No.	Pos.	Player	Date of birth (age)	Caps	Club
1	GK	Hasely Holder	4 April 1986 (aged 18)		(Trinidad and Tobago) San Juan Jabloteh
2	MF	Carl Smith	18 January 1986 (aged 18)		(United States) Univ. of South Florida
3	DF	Radhanfah Abu Bakr	12 February 1987 (aged 17)		(Trinidad and Tobago) Arima/Morvant Fire
4	DF	Marcelle François	13 September 1986 (aged 18)		(Trinidad and Tobago) San Juan Jabloteh
5	DF	Karlon Murray	6 April 1985 (aged 19)		(Trinidad and Tobago) San Juan Jabloteh
6	DF	Makan Hislop	3 September 1985 (aged 19)		(United States) Univ. of South Carolina
7	FW	Shane Calderon	19 January 1986 (aged 18)		(Trinidad and Tobago) W Connection
8	MF	Devon Maxwell	29 January 1986 (aged 18)		(Trinidad and Tobago) St. Augustine SNR School
9	DF	Kendall Jagdeosingh	30 May 1986 (aged 18)		(Trinidad and Tobago) North East Stars
10	FW	Christopher Sam	7 August 1985 (aged 19)		(Trinidad and Tobago) San Juan Jabloteh
11	DF	Aklie Edwards	17 June 1985 (aged 19)		(Trinidad and Tobago) South West Drillers
12	MF	Kezi Lara	16 October 1985 (aged 19)		(Trinidad and Tobago) Southwest Stars
13	MF	Hayden Tinto	31 August 1985 (aged 19)		(Trinidad and Tobago) Malick SNR. School
15	MF	Atulla Guerra	14 November 1987 (aged 17)		(Trinidad and Tobago) Mucurapo SNR. School
16	MF	Keon Daniel	16 January 1987 (aged 17)		(Trinidad and Tobago) St. Clair Coaching School
18	FW	Kevin Crooks	17 October 1985 (aged 19)		(United States) Young Harris College
19	FW	Abiola Sandy	17 January 1985 (aged 19)		(United States) Bowling Green Univ.
21	GK	Andre Charles	28 May 1986 (aged 18)		(Trinidad and Tobago) Unattached

=== United States ===
Head coach: (Germany) Sigi Schmid

No.	Pos.	Player	Date of birth (age)	Caps	Club
1	GK	Quentin Westberg	25 April 1986 (aged 18)		(France) Troyes
2	DF	Hunter Freeman	8 January 1985 (aged 20)		(United States) Virginia
3	DF	Marvell Wynne	8 May 1986 (aged 18)		(United States) UCLA
4	DF	Pat Phelan	16 January 1985 (aged 19)		(United States) Wake Forest University
5	MF	Patrick Ianni	15 April 1985 (aged 19)		(United States) UCLA
6	DF	Greg Dalby	3 November 1985 (aged 19)		(United States) University of Notre Dame
7	MF	Sacha Kljestan	9 September 1985 (aged 19)		(United States) Seton Hall University
8	MF	Benny Feilhaber	19 January 1985 (aged 19)		(United States) UCLA
9	FW	Chad Barrett	30 April 1985 (aged 19)		(United States) UCLA
10	MF	Arturo Alvarez	28 June 1985 (aged 19)		(United States) San Jose Earthquakes
11	FW	Freddy Adu	2 June 1989 (aged 15)		(United States) D.C. United
12	FW	Will John	13 June 1985 (aged 19)		(United States) Saint Louis University
13	FW	Jacob Peterson	27 January 1986 (aged 18)		(United States) Indiana University
14	FW	Charlie Davies	25 June 1986 (aged 18)		(United States) Boston College
15	MF	Eddie Gaven	25 October 1986 (aged 18)		(United States) MetroStars
16	DF	Tim Ward	28 February 1987 (aged 17)		(United States) MetroStars
17	MF	Danny Szetela	17 June 1987 (aged 17)		(United States) Columbus Crew
18	GK	Andrew Kartunen	7 February 1985 (aged 19)		(United States) Stanford University

== Group B ==
=== Canada ===
Head coach: (Canada) Dale Mitchell

No.	Pos.	Player	Date of birth (age)	Caps	Club
1	GK	Joshua Wagenaar	26 February 1985 (aged 19)		(United States) Hartwick College
2	MF	Vince Stewart	21 January 1986 (aged 18)		(United States) Simon Fraser Univ.
3	MF	Nikolas Ledgerwood	16 January 1985 (aged 19)		(Germany) 1860 Munich
4	DF	André Hainault	17 June 1986 (aged 18)		(Canada) Montreal Impact
5	DF	Simon Kassaye	19 May 1985 (aged 19)		Unattached
6	MF	Carlo Schiavoni	19 August 1985 (aged 19)		Unattached
7	MF	Jaime Peters	4 May 1987 (aged 17)		Unattached
8	MF	Tyler Rosenlund	13 September 1986 (aged 18)		(United States) U. California-San. Barbara
9	MF	Ryan Gyaki	6 December 1985 (aged 19)		(England) Sheffield United
10	FW	Will Johnson	21 January 1987 (aged 17)		(United States) Chicago Fire
11	MF	Marcel De Jong	15 October 1986 (aged 18)		(Netherlands) Helmond Sport
12	FW	Riley O'Neill	9 September 1985 (aged 19)		(United States) Univ. of Kentucky
13	FW	Mike D’Agostino	7 January 1987 (aged 18)		(United States) Univ. of Kentucky
14	FW	Cameron Wilson	21 August 1986 (aged 18)		(England) Bristol City
15	DF	Brad Peetoom	2 March 1986 (aged 18)		(Canada) Abbotsford
16	DF	Graham Ramalho	12 January 1986 (aged 19)		(Netherlands) Groningen
17	FW	Julian Paolo Uccello	30 October 1986 (aged 18)		(Italy) Savona
22	GK	Asmir Begović	20 June 1987 (aged 17)		(England) Portsmouth

=== Honduras ===
Head coach: (Honduras) Rubén Guifarro

No.	Pos.	Player	Date of birth (age)	Caps	Club
1	GK	Fernando Botto	15 February 1985 (aged 19)		(Honduras) Villanueva
2	DF	Maynor Martinez	8 April 1985 (aged 19)		(Honduras) Real C.D. España
4	DF	Aron Bardales	3 December 1985 (aged 19)		(Honduras) CD Olímpia
5	DF	Erick Norales	11 February 1985 (aged 19)		(Honduras) CSD Vida
6	DF	Rene Moncada	1 June 1985 (aged 19)		(Honduras) CD Olímpia
7	DF	Luis Ramos	11 April 1985 (aged 19)		(Honduras) C.D. Marathón
8	MF	Fayron Barahona	8 September 1986 (aged 18)		(Honduras) Real C.D. España
9	FW	Dionico Mejia	21 March 1985 (aged 19)		(Honduras) C.D. Motagua
10	MF	Julian Rapalo	7 August 1986 (aged 18)		(Honduras) Villanueva
12	MF	Jorge Claros	8 January 1986 (aged 19)		(Honduras) CSD Vida
13	MF	Cruz Fernando Avila	8 August 1988 (aged 16)		(Honduras) CD Platense
16	MF	Kiarol Arzu	3 March 1985 (aged 19)		(Honduras) CD Platense
17	DF	Emilio Izaguirre	10 May 1986 (aged 18)		(Honduras) C.D. Motagua
18	FW	Angel Enrique Nolasco	2 November 1986 (aged 18)		(Honduras) CD Platense
19	FW	Nestor Reyes	19 August 1985 (aged 19)		(Honduras) CD Victoria
20	MF	Hendry Thomas	23 February 1985 (aged 19)		(Honduras) CD Olímpia
21	FW	Ramon Nuñez	14 November 1985 (aged 19)		(United States) FC Dallas
22	GK	Miguel Angel Orellana	1 April 1986 (aged 18)		(Honduras) CD Olímpia

=== Jamaica ===
Head coach: (Jamaica) Wendell Downswell

No.	Pos.	Player	Date of birth (age)	Caps	Club
1	GK	Ryan Thompson	7 January 1985 (aged 20)		(Jamaica) Harbour View FC
3	DF	Kemar Munroe	19 March 1986 (aged 18)		(Jamaica) Arlington FC
4	DF	Rodolph Austin	1 June 1985 (aged 19)		(Jamaica) Portmore United
6	DF	Keneil Moodie	29 July 1986 (aged 18)		(Jamaica) Seba United
7	MF	Mario Harrison	16 May 1985 (aged 19)		(Jamaica) Reno FC
8	FW	Steven Morrissey	25 July 1986 (aged 18)		(Jamaica) Portmore United
9	FW	Luton Shelton	11 November 1985 (aged 19)		(Jamaica) Harbour View FC
10	FW	Richard West	19 July 1985 (aged 19)		(Jamaica) Waterhouse FC
11	MF	Akeem Priestley	13 April 1985 (aged 19)		(Jamaica) Harbour View FC
12	MF	Jermain Hollis	7 October 1986 (aged 18)		(England) Kidderminster Harriers
13	GK	Ralston Robinson	25 August 1985 (aged 19)		(Jamaica) Constant Spring
14	DF	Adrian Reid	10 March 1985 (aged 19)		(Jamaica) Waterhouse FC
15	FW	Horace Howell	16 August 1985 (aged 19)		(Jamaica) Tivoli Gardens FC
16	MF	Sean Giveans	10 February 1986 (aged 18)		(Jamaica) Arnett Gardens FC
17	MF	O'Brian White	14 December 1985 (aged 19)		Unattached
19	DF	Jermaine Taylor	14 January 1985 (aged 19)		(Jamaica) Harbour View FC
20	MF	Nicholay Finlayson	19 December 1985 (aged 19)		(Jamaica) Reno FC
31	DF	Kieron Bernard	2 August 1985 (aged 19)		(Jamaica) Portmore United

=== Mexico ===
Head coach: (Argentina) Humberto Grondona

No.	Pos.	Player	Date of birth (age)	Caps	Club
1	GK	Francisco Ochoa	13 July 1985 (aged 19)		(Mexico) Club América
2	DF	David Cavazos	7 October 1986 (aged 18)		(Mexico) Tigres UANL
3	MF	Julio Cesar Ceja	2 June 1986 (aged 18)		(Mexico) Cruz Azul
4	FW	Santiago Fernandez	7 March 1985 (aged 19)		(Mexico) Club América
5	DF	Willy Guerrero	31 March 1985 (aged 19)		(Mexico) C.F. Pachuca
6	DF	Luis Omar Hernandez	8 November 1985 (aged 19)		(Mexico) Delfines de Coatzacoalcos
7	MF	Diego Jiménez	7 April 1986 (aged 18)		(Mexico) U.A.G.
8	MF	Luis Angel Landin	23 July 1985 (aged 19)		(Mexico) C.F. Pachuca
9	MF	Emilio Lopez	10 May 1986 (aged 18)		(Mexico) CD Guadalajara
10	MF	Manuel Mariaca	4 January 1986 (aged 19)		(Mexico) Cruz Azul
11	MF	Jonathan Prado	19 June 1985 (aged 19)		(Mexico) Tigres UANL
12	GK	Jose Alamo	18 August 1986 (aged 18)		(Mexico) CID Necaxa
13	FW	Marco Parra	22 January 1985 (aged 19)		(Mexico) CD Guadalajara
14	MF	Alberto Ramirez	1 February 1986 (aged 18)		(Mexico) C.F. Pachuca
15	DF	Luis Enrigue Robles	22 February 1986 (aged 18)		(Mexico) Atlas CF
16	MF	Carlos Rodriguez	16 April 1985 (aged 19)		(Mexico) C.F. Pachuca
17	MF	Efrian Velarde	18 April 1986 (aged 18)		(Mexico) Pumas UNAM
18	DF	Marcos Urbina	15 April 1985 (aged 19)		(Mexico) CA Monarcas Morelia
