= Benjamin Gumbs =

Benjamin Gumbs may refer to:

- Benjamin Gumbs II (died 1768), British colonial governor and plantation owner
- Benjamin Gumbs III, British colonial governor and plantation owner
