= Tony Lee (disambiguation) =

Tony Lee (born 1970) is a British comics writer.

Tony Lee may also refer to:

- Tony Lee (actor), American actor
- Anthony Lee (actor) (1961–2000), American actor
- Tony Lee (administrator) (1923–2017), British colonial administrator in Anguilla
- Tony Lee (pianist) (1934–2004), British jazz musician
- Tony Lee (footballer, born 1937) (born 1937), English footballer with Southport in the 1950s
- Tony Lee (footballer, born 1947) (1947–2023), English footballer with Bradford City and Darlington in the 1960s, later a non-league football manager
- Tony Lee (basketball) (born 1986), American basketball player

== See also ==
- Anthony Lee (politician) (c. 1510–1549), English courtier and Member of Parliament
- Anthony Lee (actor) (1961–2000, American actor and playwright
