= Emile Gumbs =

Anguillan Head of Government (1926–2016)

The Honourable Sir Emile Gumbs MHA

Chief Minister of Anguilla
- In office 12 March 1984 – 16 March 1994
- Monarch: Elizabeth II
- Governor: Alastair Turner Baillie; Geoffrey Owen Whittaker; Brian George John Canty; Alan William Shave
- Succeeded by: Hubert Hughes
- In office 1 February 1977 – 1 May 1980
- Monarch: Elizabeth II
- Preceded by: Ronald Webster

Personal details
- Born: Emile Rudolph Gumbs; 18 March 1928 Basseterre, St. Kitts and Nevis
- Died: 10 May 2018 (aged 90) Anguilla
- Party: Anguilla National Alliance

Sir Emile Gumbs (18 March 1928 – 10 May 2018) was a politician from Anguilla. He served as the island territory's Chief Minister from 1 February 1977 to May 1980 and again from 12 March 1984 to 16 March 1994.

He was the only person from Anguilla to have been knighted, having been made a Knight Bachelor in the 1994 New Year Honours. Emile Gumbs died on 10 May 2018 at the age of 90.

Political offices
Preceded by Ronald Webster	Chief Minister of Anguilla; 1977–1980	Succeeded by Ronald Webster
Preceded by Ronald Webster	Chief Minister of Anguilla; 1984–1994	Succeeded by Hubert Hughes
