= Benjamin Roberts =

Benjamin or Ben Roberts may refer to:

- Ben Roberts (politician) (1880–1952), New Zealand cabinet minister
- Benjamin Roberts (colonial administrator), Deputy Governor of Anguilla
- Benjamin F. Roberts (1815–1881), African American printer, writer, activist and abolitionist
- Benjamin S. Roberts (1810–1875), American Civil War general
- B. T. Roberts (1823–1893), American Methodist bishop
- Ben Roberts (writer) (1916–1984), one of the creators of Charlie's Angels television series
- Ben Roberts (actor) (1950–2021), British actor (The Bill)
- Ben Roberts (poker player) (born 1956), Iranian-born British poker player
- Ben Roberts (footballer) (born 1975), English footballer
- Ben Roberts (rugby league) (born 1985), New Zealand rugby league footballer
- Ben Roberts (American football) (born 1992), American football wide receiver
- Ben Roberts (linebacker) (born 2004), American football linebacker
