= Anthony Lee =

Anthony Lee may refer to:

- Anthony Lee (politician) (c. 1510–1549), English courtier and Member of Parliament
- Anthony Lee (actor) (1961–2000), American actor and playwright

== See also ==
- Anthony Lee-Ingram (born 1988), American basketball player
- Tony Lee (disambiguation)
