= Tony Lee (administrator) =

Anthony C. W. Lee
- Born: 1923; Stratford-upon-Avon, Warwickshire, England
- Died: 14 February 2017 (aged 93–94)
- Occupation: Colonial administrator
- Known for: Commissioner of Anguilla

Anthony C. W. Lee, also known as Tony Lee (1923 – 14 February 2017) was a British colonial administrator. He served as the Commissioner of Anguilla between 1968 and 1969. He died on 14 February 2017.

== Personal life ==
Lee was born in Stratford-upon-Avon as the son of a Church of England vicar. During the Second World War, he served in the Royal Navy on PT boats and became a lieutenant before leaving the Navy in order to study Latin at Magdalene College, Cambridge.

== Colonial career ==
Lee then joined the Civil Service and was posted to Tanganyika Territory where he served for ten years. After Tanganyika's independence, he left the colonial service and worked in private industry for two years. He eventually returned to the colonial service to work in the Colony of Aden.

=== Commissioner of Anguilla ===
In 1967, there was a political crisis in the federation of Saint Christopher-Nevis-Anguilla. Anguilla had wished to secede from the federation and unilaterally declared independence as the Republic of Anguilla (though this was not recognised by the United Kingdom). During discussions between the Saint Kitts and Nevis and Anguillan authorities, the United Kingdom appointed Lee as a compromise administrator of Anguilla for a year due to the Kittians refusing to accept Anguillan independence and Anguillan refusals to accept a Kittian governor. Lee had a good relationship with the initial Island Council chairman Peter Adams but not with his successor Ronald Webster, whom pushed the Anguillan republic idea. Webster's supporters would often demand the removal of Lee from the island. When Lee's year was over, he departed the island with Webster's supporters stoning his car en route to the airport.

In 1969, Lee was formally appointed as Commissioner of Anguilla. This was declared on the island by the Parliamentary Under-Secretary of State for Foreign and Commonwealth Affairs, William Whitlock. However Whitlock, instead of following formal protocol, simply stated to the Anguillan crowd upon his arrival that Lee was appointed as Commissioner under the West Indies Act 1967 and threw pamphlets at the crowd declaring it. Whitlock was forced off the island at gunpoint as a result. Following Operation Sheepskin that led to the restoration of British rule, Lee signed off his first official message to the Anguillans with "God Save The Queen". Though Lee stated he was not happy about the military action, despite stating to a journalist that it was done: "to install me, I suppose." The amount of equipment the British Army brought to ensure Lee was installed, led to one local Anguillan to state: "They could have invaded Rhodesia with all this". Lee was later removed as Commissioner due to requests from Webster.
