= Speaker of the House of Assembly (Anguilla) =

- Coat of arms of Anguilla
- Incumbent; Tara Carter since 11 March 2025
- Style: Mr Speaker (informal and within the house); The Honourable (Formal and Diplomatic)
- Member of: House of Assembly
- Deputy: Deputy Speaker

The Speaker of the House of Assembly is the presiding officer of the Anguilla House of Assembly, the legislature of the British Overseas Territory of Anguilla. The current Speaker, Tara Carter, was elected Speaker on 11 March 2025.

The Speaker presides over the House's debates, including determining which members may speak. The speaker is also responsible for maintaining order during debate, and may punish members who break the rules of the House. The Speakers remain strictly non-partisan in the exercising of their role.

== List of Speakers ==
Name	Term of office	
Name	Took office	Left office
The Governor of Anguilla	1982	1985
Atlin Harrigan	1985	1994
Leroy Rogers	1994	2005
David Carty	2005	2010
Barbara Webster-Bourne	27 February 2010	11 May 2015
Leroy Rogers	2015	2018
Terry Harrigan	2018	2020
Barbara Webster-Bourne	17 July 2020	29 January 2025
Tara Carter	11 March 2025	Incumbent
