= Governor Johnston =

Governor Johnston may refer to:

- Gabriel Johnston (1699–1752), governor of North Carolina from 1734 to 1752
- George Johnstone (Royal Navy officer) (1730–1787), governor of West Florida from 1764 to 1767
- Henry S. Johnston (1867–1965), governor of Oklahoma from 1927 to 1929
- James Johnston (British Army officer, died 1797) (1720s–1797), governor of Quebec from 1774 to 1797
- Joseph F. Johnston (1843–1913), governor of Alabama from 1896 to 1900
- Olin D. Johnston (1896–1965), governor of South Carolina from 1943 to 1945
- Peter Johnstone (diplomat) (born 1944), governor of Anguilla from 2000 to 2004
- Samuel Johnston (1733–1816), governor of North Carolina from 1787 to 1789
- William F. Johnston (1808–1872), governor of Pennsylvania from 1848 to 1852
