= Governor Harrison =

Governor Harrison may refer to:

- Albertis Harrison (1907–1995), 59th Governor of Virginia
- Alistair Harrison (born 1954), Governor of Anguilla from 2009 to 2013
- Benjamin Harrison V (1726–1791), 5th Governor of Virginia
- Edward Harrison (British administrator) (1674–1732), Governor of Madras from 1711 to 1717
- Henry Baldwin Harrison (1821–1901), 52nd Governor of Connecticut
- William Henry Harrison (1773–1841), 1st Governor of the Indiana Territory
