= Ronald Webster =

Anguillan Head of State (1926–2016)

The Honourable Ronald Webster MHA

Chief Minister of Anguilla
- In office 1 May 1980 – 12 March 1984
- Monarch: Elizabeth II
- Governor: Charles Harry Godden; Alastair Turner Baillie
- Preceded by: Emile Gumbs
- Succeeded by: Emile Gumbs
- In office 10 February 1976 – 1 February 1977
- Monarch: Elizabeth II
- Succeeded by: Emile Gumbs

Personal details
- Born: James Ronald Webster; 2 March 1926 Island Harbour, Anguilla, Anguilla
- Died: 9 December 2016 (aged 90) Anguilla
- Party: People's Progressive Party (1976–1977); Anguilla United Party (1977–1981); Anguilla National Alliance (1981–)

James Ronald Webster (2 March 1926 – 9 December 2016) was a politician from Anguilla. After ending the Saint Christopher-Nevis-Anguilla federation in 1967, he served as the island territory's first Chief Minister from 10 February 1976 to 1 February 1977 and again from May 1980 to 12 March 1984.

== Early life and career ==
Webster was born in Island Harbour, Anguilla. He was one of 8 children to survive infancy, out a family total of 16 children. He worked in a dairy farm-factory on Saint Martin for 27 years. The owner and wife treated him as a son and left Webster with their entire estate, a small fortune. Webster returned to Anguilla in 1960 to find the island without electricity, paved streets or telephones.

Prior to serving as Chief Minister, Webster was designated Chairman of the Anguilla Island Council when the territory declared its independence from the Saint Christopher-Nevis-Anguilla government in 1967, through the Anguillan Revolution which he led. Anguillans forced the Saint Kitts officials and police off of the island, due to alleged mistreatment of the public and governmental misuse of funds.

In a referendum held on 11 July the inhabitants of Anguilla voted overwhelmingly to secede from the Associated State and to become a separate colony of Britain. Britain sent an advisor, Tony Lee, to exercise an "interim basic administrative authority" in conjunction with Ronald Webster, from January 1968 to January 1969; St. Kitts refused to extend the interim agreement and the British authorities left. In February 1969 islanders voted again to remain separate from Saint Kitts and Nevis and to become an "independent republic" with Webster leading the council.

British Junior Minister William Whitlock from the United Kingdom arrived in March 1969 to establish another "interim agreement", and was expelled within hours of arrival. Eight days later 315 British paratroopers and two frigates arrived to "restore order". Tony Lee was installed as a Commissioner for local administration. Webster left the island.

== Leadership ==
An interim agreement in 1971 was followed by a new constitution in 1976 with Webster becoming the first Chief Minister after his People's Progressive Party won the 1976 election; following a no-confidence vote supported by his fellow ministers, he was removed in 1977. In 1980 Anguilla was formally separated from Saint Kitts and Nevis and became a British colony again, with Webster returning as Chief Minister when his Anguilla United Movement won the 1980 election. Another ministerial split led to the 1981 election won by Webster's Anguilla People's Party and he stayed in power until losing the 1984 election; his Anguilla United Party also lost in 1989 election.

== Later life ==
He wrote his "Farewell Letter" which is a motivating story of his life and times. This letter was read at his grave by his wife. English and translated version (Hindi) was published in the most read newspaper of Anguilla, The Anguillian.

Webster's birthday, 2 March, has been celebrated as a public holiday in Anguilla since its proclamation in 2010.

Political offices
| Preceded by (–) | Chief Minister of Anguilla; 1976–1977 | Succeeded by Emile Gumbs |
| Preceded by Emile Gumbs | Chief Minister of Anguilla; 1980–1984 | Succeeded by Emile Gumbs |
