= Government House, Anguilla =

Coordinates: 18.2206°N 63.0686°W

Government House
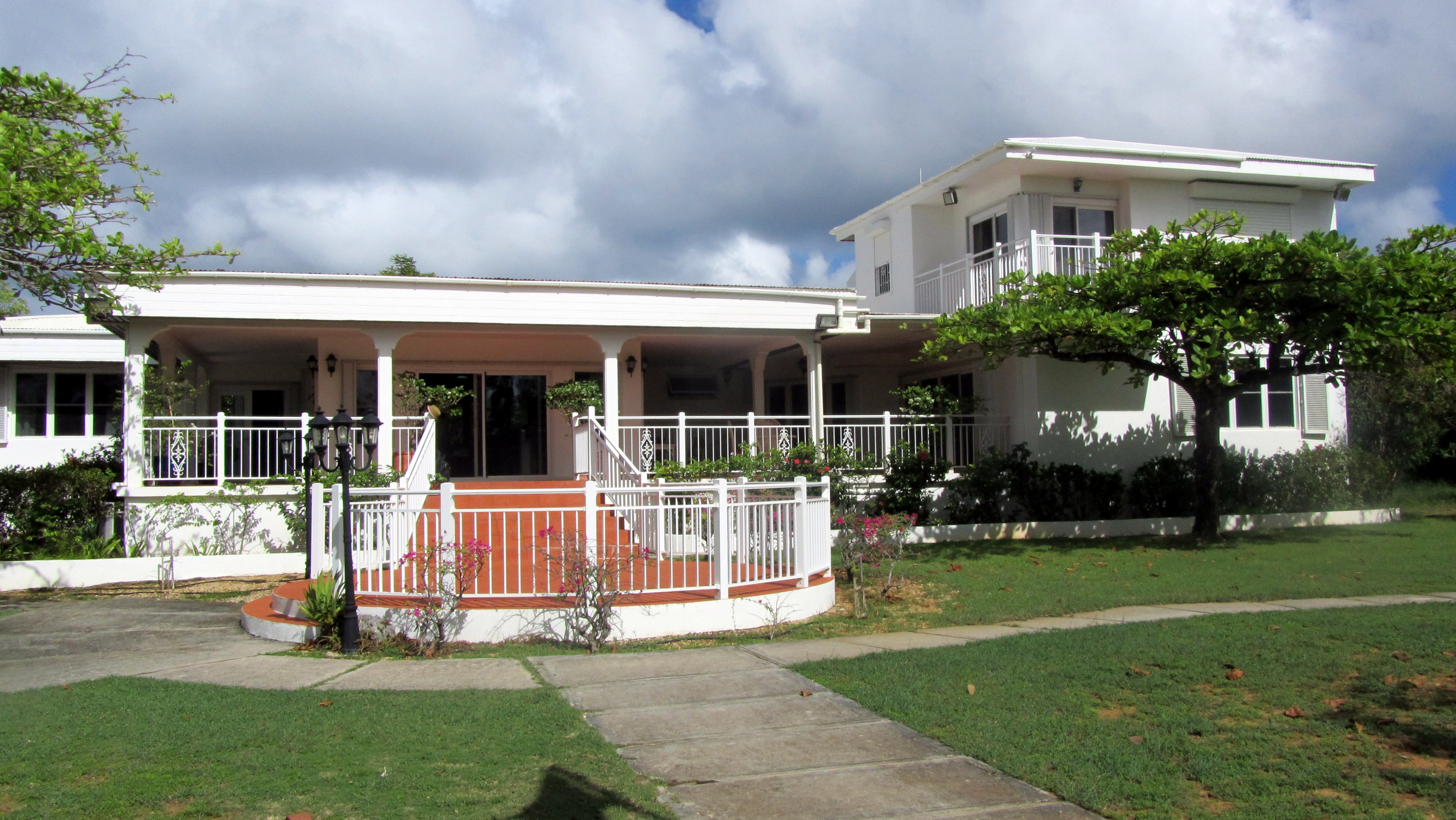
- Interactive map of the Government House area

General information
- Type: official residence
- Location: Old Ta, Anguilla
- Current tenants: Governor of Anguilla
- Construction started: 1969
- Completed: 1969
- Owner: Government of Anguilla

Government House is the official residence of the governor of Anguilla, located in Old Ta in Anguilla.

The building was first constructed in 1969, but was substantially modernised in 1974.

As well as being the residence of the Anguillan Governor and their family, Government House is also used for national and ceremonial functions, as well as receptions and meetings with visiting foreign dignitaries and heads of state. It is also the official residence of the Anguillan head of state (currently King Charles III) when staying in Anguilla.

== See also ==
- Government House - elsewhere in the Commonwealth or British Overseas Territories
- Government Houses of the British Empire and Commonwealth
