= Chris Simpkins =

Dr Chris Simpkins CBE

Chief Executive of the Falkland Islands
- In office March 2003 – 12 September 2007
- Monarch: Elizabeth II
- Governor: Alan Huckle; Howard Pearce
- Preceded by: Michael Blanch
- Succeeded by: Michael Blanch (interim)

Director General of The Royal British Legion
- In office September 2007 – August 2016

Personal details
- Born: Christopher John Simpkins; 1952 (age 73–74)

Christopher John Simpkins CBE (born c. 1950) is an English administrator who was Chief Executive of the Falkland Islands from March 2003 to September 2007.

The position of Chief Executive of the Falkland Islands is a three-year appointment in the first instance, with a possible extension for a further 2 years. It is a civil service position, made by an appointment panel.

Before his appointment, Chris Simpkins was Chief Executive of South Holland District Council in Lincolnshire, England.

Simpkins resigned from his position of chief executive and left office on 12 September 2007.

In October, 2007, Simpkins was appointed as the director general of the Royal British Legion. He was appointed Commander of the Order of the British Empire (CBE) in the 2017 New Year Honours for services to the Armed Forces Community prior to which he was awarded an honorary doctorate by Loughborough University.
