= William Richardson (colonial administrator) =

British colonial governor

William Richardson was a British colonial governor. He was Deputy Governor of Anguilla from 1805 until 1829.

Preceded by Thomas Hodge	Deputy Governor of Anguilla; 1805–1829	Succeeded by Richard Challenger
