= Richard Challenger =

British colonial governor

Richard Challenger was a British colonial governor. He was Chief magistrate of Anguilla from 1842 until 1846. He was later appointed Auditor-General for Saint Christopher in 1867.

Preceded by William Richardson	Chief Magistrate of Anguilla; 1842–1846	Succeeded by Isidor Dyett
