= Abraham Howell =

British colonial governor

Abraham Howell was a British colonial governor who served as Deputy Governor of Anguilla and led a failed attempt to colonise Crab Island. He led the defence of Anguilla during the Nine Years' War before being defeated by the French. His effort to colonise Crab Island was stopped by the Spanish and they temporarily held him prisoner.

== Career ==
A colony in Anguilla was established by settlers from St. Kitts and Nevis in 1650. This colony was attacked by the indigenous people in 1656, and the surviving colonists appointed Howell as their leader. The Spanish attacked Anguilla on 21 December 1688, but were defeated by Howell. During the Nine Years' War the French seized Anguilla in 1689 despite a defence led by Howell.

English colonists attempted to colonise Crab Island in 1683 and 1688, but failed. A group of 42 people petitioned Walter Hamilton, governor of the British Leeward Islands, in 1717 for official approval to colonise the island, but Hamilton rejected their petition citing how close Crab Island was to the Captaincy General of Puerto Rico and that the colony would not have a sizeable population. However, the petitioners, led by Howell, left despite Hamilton's disapproval. A census reported that 46 white men and 62 black men were part of Howell's colony. Hamilton later gave Howell a commission as commandant of the settlement on Crab Island.

A Spanish force of schooners and 289 militia men arrived on Crab Island in March 1718 and seized control without opposition from Howell. The Spanish seized multiple sloops and captured 50 black people, Howell, and other people before sending them to Puerto Rico. Hamilton sent HMS Scarborough to Puerto Rico to demand the release of the prisoners. Howell secured his own release due to an agent of the Asiento de Negros company and went to St. Kitts on a sloop from Jamaica. He warned the British that the Spanish were planning to attack the Bahama Islands and a Spanish raid was later conducted there. The property confiscated by the Spanish, including slaves that were auctioned off in Puerto Rico, resulted in a revenue of 100,584 pesos.

== Works cited ==
=== Books ===
- Fortescue, J., ed. (1901). Calendar of State Papers Colonial, America and West Indies: Volume 13, 1689–1692. Vol. 13. Office of Public Sector Information.
- Headlam, Cecil, ed. (1930). Calendar of State Papers Colonial, America and West Indies: 1717–1718. Vol. 30. Office of Public Sector Information. Archived from the original on 8 May 2026.

=== Journals ===
- Childs, John (1995). "Secondary Operations of the British Army During the Nine Years' War, 1688–1697". Journal of the Society for Army Historical Research. 73 (294). Society for Army Historical Research: 73–98. JSTOR 44229987.
- Walicek, Don (2012). "Migration from Anguilla to 18th Century Puerto Rico: A Socio-linguistic Approach to African Identities in Caribbean Context". Cuadernos de Investigación Histórica. 7. University of Puerto Rico: 51–68.

=== News ===
- Azevedo, Lillian (23 March 2012). "Heritage Corner by Lillian Azevedo: 1650-1670 The First Settlers". The Anguillian Newspaper. Archived from the original on 8 May 2026.

Preceded by William Watts	Deputy Governor of Anguilla; 1666–1689	Succeeded by George Leonard
