= William Watts (colonial administrator) =

British colonial governor

Deputy Governor of Anguilla
- In office 1660–1666

Governor of Saint Kitts

Personal details
- Occupation: Colonial governor; sea captain
- Known for: Colonial administration in the Caribbean; military expedition against Saint Martin

William Watts was a British colonial governor, a sea captain under the Commonwealth sent to the Caribbean shortly after the English Restoration. He was Deputy Governor of Anguilla from 1660 to 1666, and also governed St Kitts.

Watts was an appointee of Francis Willoughby, 5th Baron Willoughby of Parham. On St Kitts he ran a profitable sugar cane estate using slave labour.

As an act of the Second Anglo-Dutch War, Watts sent an expedition against Saint Martin. It brought French retaliation on St Kitts.

Preceded by None	Deputy Governor of Anguilla; 1660–1666	Succeeded by Abraham Howell
