= John Richardson (colonial administrator) =

British colonial administrator (1679–1742)

John Richardson (16 March 1679 – 25 December 1742) was a British colonial administrator who served as the deputy governor of Anguilla from 1735 to 1741.

Government offices
Preceded by George Leonard	Deputy governor of Anguilla; 1735–1741	Succeeded by Arthur Hodge
