= John Welch (colonial administrator) =

British colonial governor

John Welch was a British colonial governor. He was Deputy Governor of Anguilla from 1749 until 1750.

Preceded by Arthur Hodge	Deputy Governor of Anguilla; 1749–1750	Succeeded by Benjamin Gumbs II
