= Alan Hoole =

Governor of Saint Helena, Ascension and Tristan da Cunha

Alan Norman Hoole OBE

Governor of Anguilla
- In office 1995–1996
- Preceded by: Alan William Shave
- Succeeded by: Robert Harris

Governor of Saint Helena, Ascension and Tristan da Cunha
- In office 17 May 1991 – 17 April 1995
- Preceded by: Robert F. Stimson
- Succeeded by: David Leslie Smallman

Personal details
- Born: 25 April 1942
- Died: 8 May 2000 (aged 58)
- Education: Sheffield University; College of Law

Alan Norman Hoole (25 April 1942 – 8 May 2000) was the Governor of Saint Helena, Ascension and Tristan da Cunha between 1991 and 1995; he then served as Governor of Anguilla between 1995 and 1996.

He was educated at Sheffield University and College of Law, London, and had previously worked as a solicitor.

Hoole died in May 2000, at the age of 58.
