= Tara Carter =

Anguillan politician

Tara Carter MHA
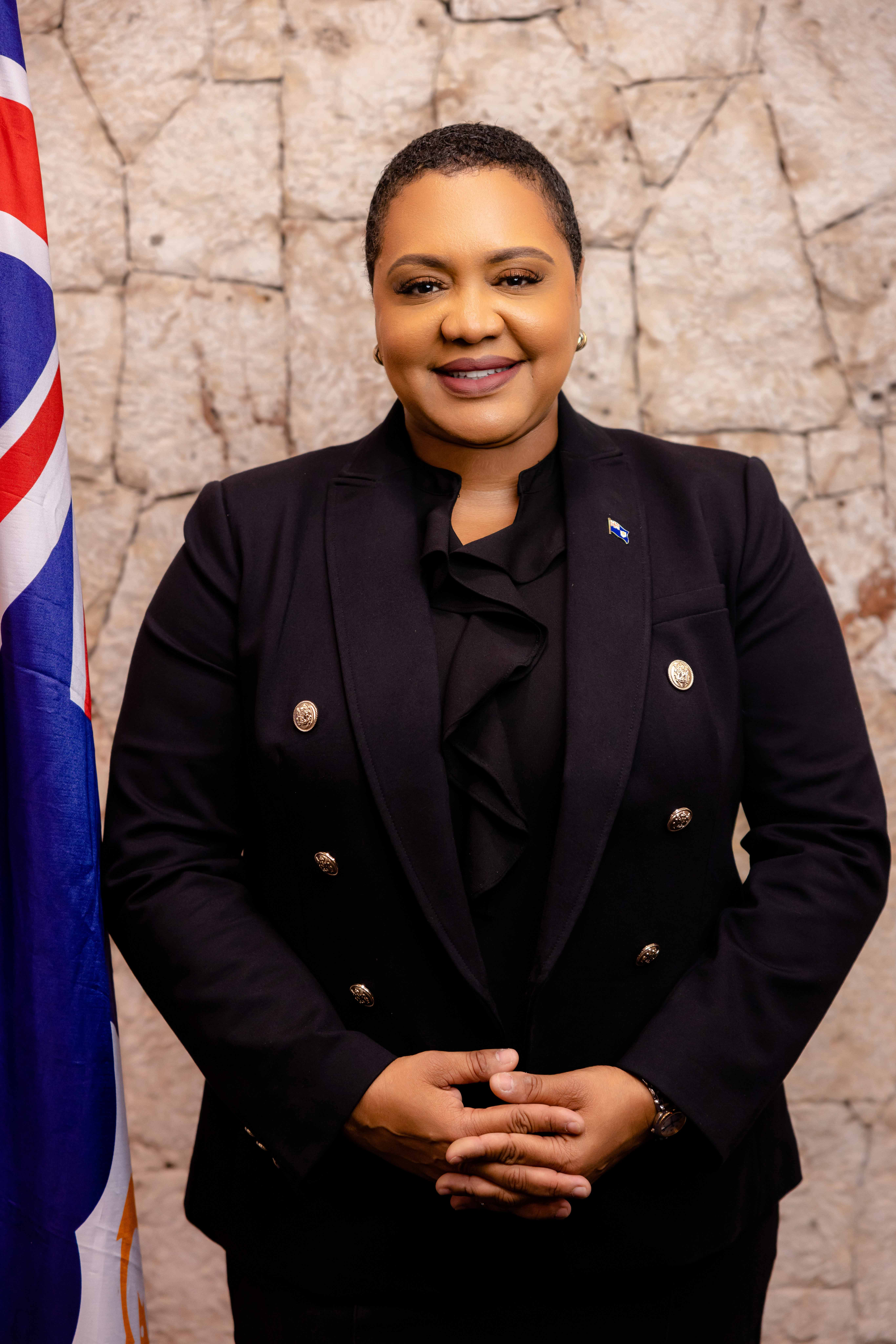

Speaker of the House of Assembly
- Incumbent
- Assumed office 11 March 2025
- Preceded by: Barbara Webster-Bourne

Personal details
- Party: Anguilla United Front
- Education: University of Manitoba

Tara K. Carter is an Anguillan politician. She has served as Speaker of the Anguilla House of Assembly since 11 March 2025.
