= George Leonard (colonial administrator) =

British colonial governor

George Leonard (c. 1655 - c.1735) was a British colonial official. He was deputy governor of Anguilla from 1689 until around 1735.

Preceded by Abraham Howell	Deputy Governor of Anguilla; 1689–1735	Succeeded by John Richardson
