= Marcella Liburd =

Governor-General of Saint Kitts and Nevis since 2023

Her Excellency Dame Marcella Liburd GCMG JP
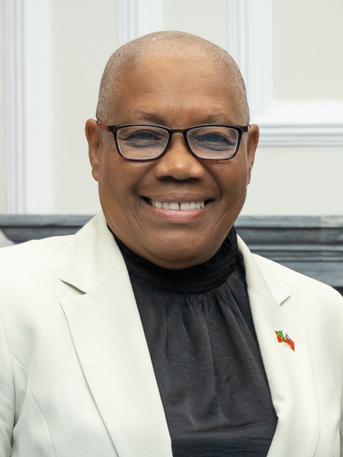
- Liburd in 2023

5th Governor-General of Saint Kitts and Nevis
- Incumbent
- Assumed office 1 February 2023
- Monarch: Charles III
- Prime Minister: Terrance Drew
- Deputy: Walford Gumbs
- Preceded by: Tapley Seaton

Speaker of the National Assembly
- In office December 2004 – 18 April 2008
- Preceded by: Walford Gumbs
- Succeeded by: Curtis Martin

Personal details
- Born: 10 July 1953 (age 73) Basseterre, Saint Kitts and Nevis
- Education: University of the West Indies (BA)
- Website: Official website

Dame Marcella Althea Liburd GCMG JP (born 10 July 1953) is a Kittitian politician who is the fifth governor-general of Saint Kitts and Nevis, serving since 2023. Trained as a teacher and then as a barrister and solicitor, Liburd was the first woman to serve as both the Speaker of the National Assembly of Saint Kitts and Nevis and the Governor-General, as well as the first Governor-General appointed by Charles III (rather than being carried over from Elizabeth II's reign). She has served in various Ministerial positions including Acting Prime Minister and Chair of the Opposition for the Labour Party. She was the first woman to serve as Chair in the 81-year-old organization’s history.

== Early life ==
Marcella Liburd was born on 10 July 1953 in Basseterre, Saint Kitts, St. Kitts and Nevis to Anne Eliza (née Martin) and Clement Liburd. After attending Basseterre Girls School, Liburd graduated from Basseterre High School. She earned her Bachelor of Arts from the University of the West Indies in 1976.

== Career ==
Liburd returned from abroad and began teaching at Basseterre and Cayon High Schools. She returned to her own studies, obtaining a Bachelor of Law with honours in 1992 from Norman Manley Law School (NMLS) where she continued her education, earning a Legal Education Certificate from NMLS in 1994. After Liburd's admission as a barrister and solicitor for the Eastern Supreme Court in 1994, she began a political career. She was appointed as Secretary of the Labour Party in 1997. In 2004, she became Speaker of the National Assembly, the first woman to serve in that capacity in the country. Liburd served until 2008, when she ran as a candidate for Constituency No. 2, St. Kitts and was elected as a Member of Parliament.

Liburd has drafted legislation that includes the Domestic Violence Act and Equal Pay Act. She has served as the Minister of Health, Social Services, Community Development, Culture and Gender Affairs, as well as Acting Prime Minister. In 2011, Liburd was featured in an exhibit promoted by various departments of the Government of Saint Kitts and Nevis to highlight prominent women's accomplishments.

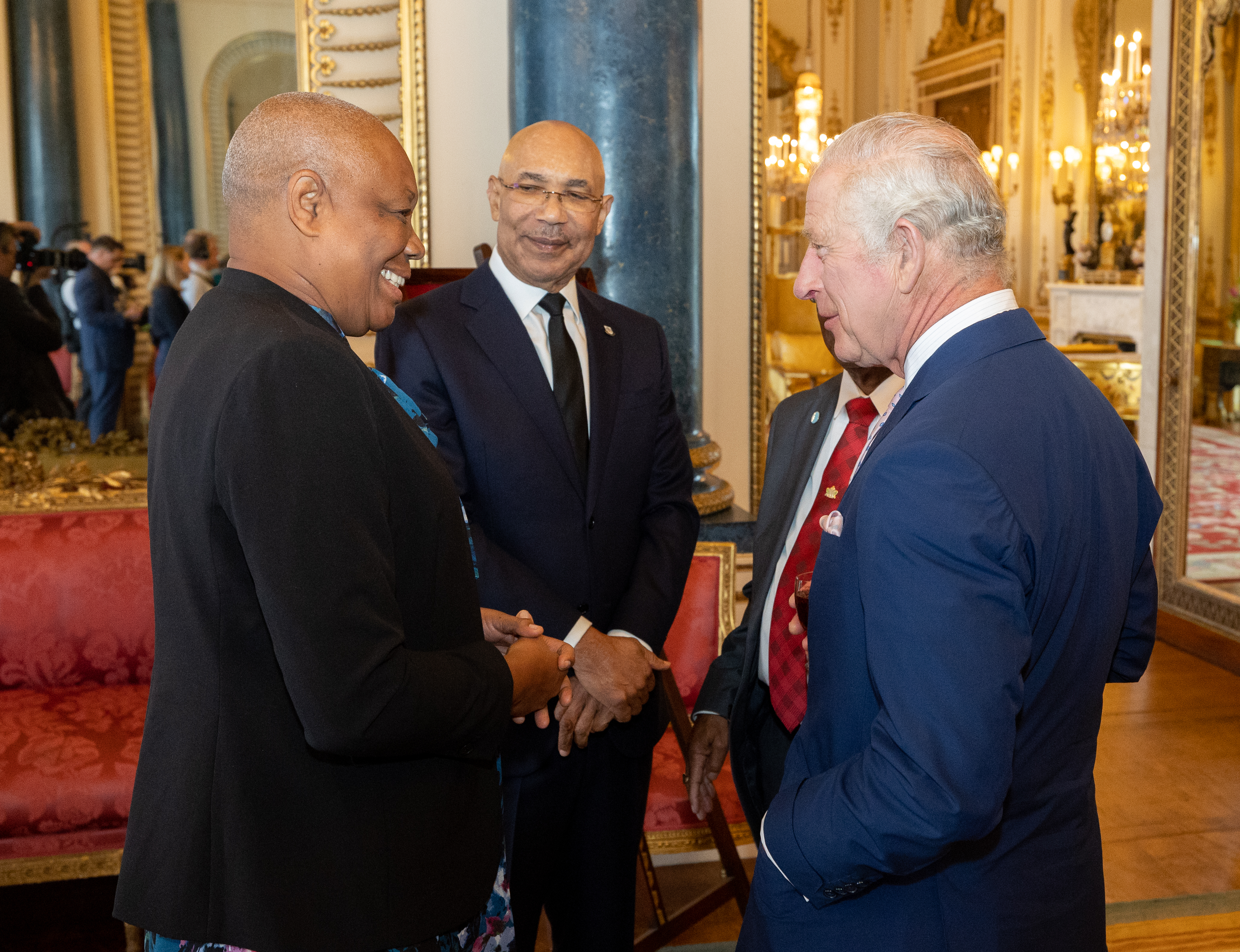
Liburd with King Charles III at Buckingham Palace, 5 May 2023

In 2013, Liburd became the first woman elected as Chair of the Labour Party in its 81-year history. In 2015, the Labor Party was removed from office for the first time in twenty years, making her a member of the Opposition. She became the first woman deputy leader of the National Labor Party in 2018 and was appointed Governor-General’s Deputy in 2022. Liburd was installed as the first woman to become Governor-General for the Federation of St Kitts and Nevis on 1 February 2023. Later that week, she was appointed Dame Grand Cross of the Order of St Michael and St George (GCMG).

== See also ==
- First women lawyers around the world

Government offices
Preceded by Tapley Seaton	Governor-General of Saint Kitts and Nevis; 2023–present	Incumbent
