= Anne Liburd =

Kittitian women's rights activist (1920–2007)

- Born: Anne Eliza Martin; 12 December 1920; Antigua
- Died: 13 September 2007 (aged 86); Basseterre, Saint Kitts, St. Kitts and Nevis
- Other names: Ann Liburd
- Occupations: educator, civil service secretary, women's rights activist, labor activist
- Years active: 1946–1996

Anne Liburd MBE (12 December 1920 – 13 September 2007) also known as Ann Liburd was a Kittitian women's rights activist and community organizer. She served as president of the National Council of Women in St. Kitts and was the first and then three-time president of the Caribbean Women's Association. She headed several programs to develop women's entrepreneurial skills and then served as the first president of the Federation of Labour Women, a political affiliation of the Saint Kitts and Nevis Labour Party to help women gain leadership and communication skills.

== Early life ==
Anne Eliza Martin was born on 12 December 1920 in Antigua to Alice Maude (née Cornelius) and Jacob Martin. Her mother, a staunch supporter of education, was a laundress and her father engaged in farming. They were related to the Bird family, which had members who served as Prime Ministers in the country. Martin completed her schooling in Antigua and after high school passed her Senior Cambridge Examination, allowing her to teach. At the age of 17, Martin gave birth to her first son, Clarence Fitzroy Bryant, who would later serve as St. Kitt's Minister of Education and Attorney General. Fitzroy was followed by sons Ronan and Tyrone.

== Career ==
Martin found work in a printing company and during the war years met a Nevisian army reservist, Clement Liburd, whom she married in 1944. Two years after her marriage, Liburd and her family, which now included a fourth son, Karl, moved to St. Kitts. She began teaching at Trinity School, riding her bicycle daily from her home in Basseterre to the school in the Trinity Parish. During this time, she had two more children, a son, Clement Juni Liburd, Jr. who would become Director of Broadcasting for the St. Kitts Nevis Information Service, and a daughter, Marcella, who later became the Minister of Health, Social Services, Community Development, Culture and Gender Affairs.

Liburd soon joined the worker's movement providing training for poor women to learn both parenting skills and employment training, guiding them in opening and operating their own businesses. After teaching for several years, she became a civil servant working in the areas of finance and administration. In the 1960s and 1970s, she worked to help develop education policies to improve the opportunities of all children to receive education. Liburd was the first president of the Caribbean Women's Association (CARIWA), an umbrella organization formed in 1970 to collectively mobilize and unite women and women's organizations throughout the region, and was re-elected to the office three times. During the same period, she served as president of the National Council of Women in St. Kitts and during her tenure launched the "Learn to Earn" program which gained acclaim throughout the Caribbean and Canada. The program taught entrepreneurial skills to help women gain economic independence.

In 1974, when the Labour Party created the Federation of Labour Women, Liburd was elected as its first president. The following year, she founded the Toast Mistress Club of St. Kitts and Nevis to train women in effective communication skills. Throughout the 1970s, Liburd represented the Labour Women at numerous international conferences sponsored by the United Nations. She attended the inaugural conference for the Decade for Women held in Mexico City, the mid-decade conference held in 1985 in Copenhagen; and was also a representative at the 1990 conference of Nairobi. She kept a black board updated with local events at the Masses House, in an age devoid of talk radio. The board was vandalized and removed many times, but always returned so that Liburd could exercise her right to free speech.

Between 1982 and 1985, Liburd helped anchor the Trade Union Education Institute and University of the West Indies (UWI) interdisciplinary project to provide training and leadership capacity and teach the history of women's contributions to society as citizens, activists, laborers, and leaders. From 1985 to 1986, she served as one of the policy makers during the Caribbean Women for Democracy conferences held in The Bahamas, Dominica, and Jamaica. Liburd was an executive member of the St. Kitts and Nevis Trade and Labour Union, traveling abroad to numerous training events as its representative. In 1996, she received membership in the Order of the British Empire for her community service work.

Upon retirement from the civil service, Liburd used her bonus to open a specialty shop where she sold clothing, toiletries, ginger beer, and mauby, as well as her own baked goods. She used her shop to sell local products and provide income for the women of her community who made the goods. In 2004, Liburd was honored with a "Woman of Great Esteem" award by the organization of the same name of New York, for her contributions to the development of women's opportunities in St. Kitts and Nevis.

== Death and legacy ==
Liburd died 13 September 2007 in Basseterre, St. Kitts and was buried in the Springfield Cemetery in Basseterre on 25 September 2007. News of her death led lecturers from UWI to create a series of lectures called Forever Indebted to Women to highlight the contributions of Caribbean trade women to the history of their countries. The first lecture Annstory began in St. Kitts and traveled to twelve countries throughout the region, beginning at the end of 2007. In 2011, Liburd was featured in an exhibit promoted by various departments of the Government of Saint Kitts and Nevis to highlight prominent women's accomplishments.
