= Thomas Hodge (governor) =

British colonial governor

Thomas Hodge was a British colonial governor. He was Deputy Governor of Anguilla from 1782 until around 1805.

Preceded by Benjamin Gumbs III	Deputy Governor of Anguilla; 1782–1805	Succeeded by William Richardson
