= John Smith (Deputy Governor of Anguilla) =

British colonial governor

John Smith was a British colonial governor. He was Deputy Governor of Anguilla from 1771 until 1776.

Preceded by Benjamin Roberts	Deputy Governor of Anguilla; 1771–1776	Succeeded by Benjamin Gumbs III
