= Michael Blanch =

British diplomat

The Reverend Dr. Michael Blanch TD

Chief Executive of the Falkland Islands
- In office 12 September 2007 – 3 January 2008
- Monarch: Elizabeth II
- Governor: Alan Huckle
- Preceded by: Chris Simpkins
- Succeeded by: Tim Thorogood
- In office January 2000 – March 2003
- Monarch: Elizabeth II
- Governor: Howard Pearce
- Preceded by: Andrew Gurr
- Succeeded by: Chris Simpkins

Personal details
- Born: 1946 (age 79–80)

Michael Dennis Blanch TD (born c. 1946) is a British local government officer who served as Chief Executive of the Falkland Islands from January 2000 to March 2003, and again as interim Chief Executive from 12 September 2007 to 3 January 2008.

Blanch studied economics at university, gaining a PhD in 1975, and was a member of the Territorial Army for 26 years. In 1991, he became Chief Executive of Eastbourne Borough Council before moving to become Bromley LBC's Chief Executive in 1995.

In 1999, Blanch was selected to be Chief Executive of the Falkland Islands by the Islands' Executive Council, taking office in January 2000. He left office in 2003 but returned to the Falklands in 2007 to service as interim Chief Executive for three months following the sudden resignation of Chris Simpkins.

Blanch was ordained at Ripon Cathedral in 2009, and served as Assistant Curate of Askrigg and Stalling Busk in the Yorkshire Dales. In 2014 he became Vicar of Hampden Park Eastbourne and in 2017 Vicar of Isfield in East Sussex.
