= Arthur Hodge (colonial administrator) =

British colonial governor (died 1749)

Arthur Hodge (died January 1749) was a British colonial governor. He was Deputy Governor of Anguilla from 30 June 1741 until 28 January 1749. He was in charge of defending the island during 1745 when the small British garrison defeated an attempt by 760 French soldiers and marines to capture the place in June.

Preceded by John Richardson	Deputy Governor of Anguilla; 1741–1749	Succeeded by John Welch
