= Geoffrey Owen Whittaker =

Geoffrey Owen Whittaker OBE

Governor of Anguilla
- In office 1987–1989
- Prime Minister: Emile Gumbs
- Preceded by: Alastair Turner Baillie
- Succeeded by: Brian G.J. Canty

Personal details
- Born: 10 January 1932 Sherwood, Nottingham
- Died: 24 February 2015 (aged 83) Ashley, Northamptonshire, United Kingdom
- Spouse(s): Annette Faith Whittaker (nee Harris; d. 8 April 2019)
- Children: Fiona; Ian
- Education: Bristol University
- Profession: Civil servant

Geoffrey Owen Whittaker, OBE (10 January 1932 – 24 February 2015) was a British civil servant. He served as the Governor of the British Overseas Territory of Anguilla from 1987 until 1989.

Second son of Alfred James Whittaker (d. 1971) and Gertrude Austen (née Holvey, d. 1984), he was born in Sherwood, Nottingham, the third of three children. He attended Haydn Road Elementary School, Sherwood, Nottingham. He later attended Nottingham High School as a Foundation Scholar before reading Commerce at Bristol University. At both he excelled at Rugby playing as a loose forward and winger and at cricket as a fast bowler.

He was articled to an accountant in Nottingham but before qualifying joined the Colonial Audit Service.

His first posting was in 1956 to Mwanza in Lake Province, Tanganyika (now Tanzania). He met his wife, Annette, on the MV Clan MacInness en route.

In 1958 he was transferred to Roseau, Dominica, where he married Annette in 1959.

He was transferred to Grenada in 1960 where he remained until 1967. He was awarded MBE in 1963.

In 1967 he was transferred to British Honduras (now Belize) where he remained until 1969, when he returned to the UK.

It was intended that he be posted to Lesotho. However, at the last moment he was transferred to St Helena arriving as Colonial Treasurer in September 1970 on the MV Good Hope Castle. He was awarded OBE in 1974.

In 1975 he was transferred to Montserrat where he served as Financial Secretary. He served as Acting Governor for approximately a year upon the death in service of the Governor, Derek Matthews, pending the arrival of Gwilym Wyn Jones.

In 1978 he was transferred to the British Virgin Islands where he served as Financial Secretary until 1980.

Between 1980 and 1987 he served in the Finance Branch of the Hong Kong Government during which time he was appointed General Manager of the Hong Kong Government-run Hong Kong Industrial Estates Corporation.

In 1987 he was appointed Governor of Anguilla where he served until his retirement in 1989 when he returned to the family home in Ashley, Northamptonshire.

He died at his home on 24 February 2015 at the age of 83. He was survived by his wife, Annette (d. 8 April 2019), and two children, Fiona and Ian.

Political offices
| Preceded by Alastair Turner Baillie | Governor of Anguilla; 1987–1989 | Succeeded by Brian G.J. Canty |
