= Vincent F. Byron =

British colonial governor

Vincent Fitzgerald Byron was a British colonial governor. He was magistrate of Anguilla from 1962 to 31 May 1967, although he left Anguilla on 9 March 1967.

Preceded by G.C.H. Thomas	Chief Magistrate of Anguilla; 1962-1967	Succeeded by Peter Adams
