= Keneil Moodie =

Jamaican footballer (born 1986)

Personal information
- Date of birth: 29 July 1986 (age 40)
- Position: Midfielder

Team information
- Current team: Montego Bay Utd

Senior career*
| Years | Team | Apps | (Gls) |
| 2004–2006 | Reno | | |
| 2006–2010 | Seba United | | |
| 2010–2011 | Waterhouse | | |
| 2011– | Montego Bay Utd | | |

International career^{‡}
| 2005– | Jamaica | 18 | (0) |
- * Club domestic league appearances and goals as of 7 September 2011 ‡ National team caps and goals as of 7 September 2011

Keneil Moodie (born 29 July 1986) is a Jamaican international footballer who plays for Montego Bay Utd, as a midfielder.

== Club career ==
Moodie has played club football for Reno, Seba United and Waterhouse, before joining Montego Bay.

== International career ==
He made his international debut for Jamaica in 2005, and has appeared in FIFA World Cup qualifying matches.
