= Robert Harris (diplomat) =

British politician (born 1941)

Robert Malcolm Harris (born 9 February 1941) was the Governor of Anguilla for the period December 1996 – 27 January 2000. He became acting governor after Alan Hoole became seriously ill.

Government offices
Preceded by Alan Hoole	Governor of Anguilla; 1996–2000	Succeeded by Peter Johnstone
