= Christina Scott =

British civil servant and diplomat

Christina Scott CMG
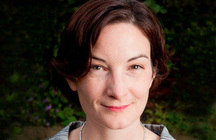

12th Governor of Anguilla
- In office 23 July 2013 – 17 August 2017
- Monarch: Elizabeth II
- Preceded by: Alistair Harrison
- Succeeded by: Tim Foy

Personal details
- Born: 25 December 1974 (age 51)
- Spouse: Chris Martin (divorced)
- Education: Christ Church, Oxford
- Occupation: Civil servant

Christina Martha Elena Scott CMG (born 25 December 1974) is a British civil servant and diplomat, currently serving as Director General Network at the Foreign, Commonwealth & Development Office (FCDO). She is responsible for leading and managing the global network, ensuring the FCDO acts as the integrator of the UK government's priorities and capabilities abroad, and for relationships with key international governments and foreign stakeholders. She served as Governor of Anguilla between 2013 and 2017, and was the first woman to hold the post. She was appointed Deputy Head of Mission at the British Embassy Beijing in September 2018. From October 2022 to October 2025, she served as Minister and Deputy High Commissioner to India at the British High Commission in New Delhi.

She was educated at Francis Holland School, Clarence Gate and Christ Church, Oxford.

Prior to her governorship of Anguilla, she was a civil servant:

- Director of the Civil Contingencies Secretariat in the Cabinet Office (2009–13)
- Private Secretary to the Prime Minister (2006–2009)

Scott has worked at HM Treasury, Department for Transport and at the European Commission.

She was appointed Companion of the Order of St Michael and St George (CMG) in the 2021 New Year Honours for services to British foreign policy.

== Personal ==
Scott was married to Chris Martin (1973–2015), a civil servant. They separated in 2011 and he later remarried. They had no children from their marriage.

Government offices
Preceded by Alistair Harrison	Governor of Anguilla; 2013–2017	Succeeded by Tim Foy
