= Walford Gumbs =

Politician from Saint Kitts and Nevis

Walford Gumbs OBE JP

Speaker of the National Assembly of Saint Kitts and Nevis
- In office 1996–2004
- Prime Minister: Denzil Douglas
- Preceded by: Ivan Buchanan
- Succeeded by: Marcella Liburd

Personal details
- Born: ca. 1948-1950
- Party: SKNLP

Walford Vincent Gumbs OBE JP is a politician from Saint Kitts and Nevis.

In 2010 Gumbs was 61 years old, so he was born about 1948–1950. He was former president of the Saint Kitts and Nevis Trades and Labour Union. He was the Speaker of National Assembly of Saint Kitts and Nevis from 1996 to 2004. He was later appointed as the first ombudsman of Saint Kitts and Nevis in August 2008.

He was appointed Officer of the Order of the British Empire (OBE) in the 2006 New Year Honours for services to trade unionism.

Gumbs has held the role of Governor-General's Deputy multiple times including in May and October 2023, and in March 2024 and March 2025, a role defined in the constitution that allows someone else to temporarily assume the duties of Governor-General when the serving Governor-General is away from St Kitts and Nevis.
