= Tony Lee (footballer, born 1937) =

English footballer

Personal information
- Full name: Anthony Lee
- Date of birth: 4 June 1937
- Place of birth: Manchester, England
- Position: Left winger

Senior career*
Years	Team	Apps	(Gls)
19??–1958	Cheadle Rovers		
1958–1959	Southport	10	(1)
1959–19??	Cheadle Rovers		
- * Club domestic league appearances and goals

Anthony Lee (born 4 June 1937) is an English former amateur footballer who played on the left wing in the Football League for Southport. He also played non-league football for Cheadle Rovers.
