= Andrew George (diplomat) =

British diplomat (born 1952)

Governor of Anguilla
- In office 10 July 2006 – 11 March 2009
- Monarch: Elizabeth II
- Prime Minister: Osbourne Fleming
- Preceded by: Alan Huckle

Personal details
- Born: 9 October 1952 (age 73) Edinburgh, Scotland, U.K.
- Spouse: Watanalak George

Andrew Neil George (born 9 October 1952) is a British diplomat. George served as the Governor and Commander-in-Chief of Anguilla from July 2006 to March 2009.

Prior to becoming governor, he had a long career serving the Foreign and Commonwealth Office including postings in Australia, Paraguay, Thailand (where he met his wife) and Indonesia, where his posting ended early after the 2002 Bali bombings.

== Personal life ==
His wife, Watanalak George was born in Thailand. The couple have two children: a daughter, Arada and a son, Michael.

Andrew George grew up in Scotland and has a university degree in politics and modern history.

== See also ==
- List of current heads of government of dependencies
- Governor of Anguilla

Government offices
Preceded by Alan Huckle	Governor of Anguilla; 2006–2009	Succeeded by Alistair Harrison
