= Charles Henry Godden =

British colonial administrator and diplomat (1922–2020)

Charles Henry Godden, CBE (19 November 1922 – 10 June 2020) was a British colonial administrator and diplomat who served as Her Majesty's Commissioner, then Governor of Anguilla, from 1978 to 1983.

Godden was appointed a Commander of the Order of the British Empire in 1981.
