= Roy Gumbs =

Anguillan footballer

Personal information
- Full name: 29 December 1969 (age 56)
- Position: Striker

Senior career*
Years	Team	Apps	(Gls)
1994–2007	Beaconsfield SYCOB	?	(?)
2007–2010	Slough Town	?	(?)

International career
2008	Anguilla	1	(0)
- * Club domestic league appearances and goals

Roy Gumbs (born 29 December 1969) is an Anguillan international footballer who plays as a striker.

== Career ==
Gumbs has played club football in England for Beaconsfield SYCOB and Slough Town.

He made one international appearance for Anguilla in 2008.
