= Benjamin Gumbs III =

British colonial governor

Benjamin Gumbs III was a British colonial governor and plantation owner. He was the son of Benjamin Gumbs II. He was Deputy Governor of Anguilla from 1776 until around 1782.

Political offices
Preceded by John Smith	Deputy Governor of Anguilla; 1776–1782	Succeeded by Thomas Hodge
