= Benjamin Roberts (colonial administrator) =

British colonial governor

Benjamin Roberts was a British colonial governor. He was Deputy Governor of Anguilla from 1768 until 1771.

== Career in the Indian Department ==
In 1766, Roberts was appointed as the Commissary of Indian Affairs at Fort Michilimackinac by Sir William Johnson, the Superintendent of Indian Affairs for the Northern District. Roberts was tasked with implementing the Crown's new trade regulations, which aimed to centralize the fur trade within forts and prevent the exploitation of Native American groups by unlicensed private traders.

Preceded by Benjamin Gumbs II	Deputy Governor of Anguilla; 1768–1771	Succeeded by John Smith
