= Alan Huckle =

British Colonial Governor and Commissioner

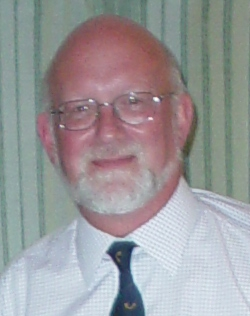

Governor of the Falkland Islands and Commissioner for South Georgia and the South Sandwich Islands
- In office 2006–2010
- Monarch: Elizabeth II
- Chief Executive: Chris Simpkins; Michael Blanch; Tim Thorogood
- Preceded by: Howard Pearce
- Succeeded by: Nigel Haywood

Governor of Anguilla
- In office 2004–2005
- Monarch: Elizabeth II
- Premier: Osbourne Fleming
- Preceded by: Dileeni Daniel-Selvaratnam
- Succeeded by: Andrew George

Commissioner of the British Indian Ocean Territory and the British Antarctic Territory
- In office 2001–2004
- Monarch: Elizabeth II
- Prime Minister: Tony Blair
- Preceded by: Charles John Branford White
- Succeeded by: Anthony Campbell Crombie

Personal details
- Born: 15 June 1948 (age 78)

Alan Edden Huckle (born 15 June 1948) is a British civil servant and administrator who served as the Commissioner for the British Indian Ocean Territory, Governor of Anguilla, Governor of the Falkland Islands, and Commissioner for South Georgia and the South Sandwich Islands. During his civil service career he worked for the Civil Service, Northern Ireland Office, and Foreign and Commonwealth Office.

== Early life ==
Alan Edden Huckle was born on 15 June 1948.

== Career ==
=== Civil service ===
Huckle worked in the Civil Service from 1971 to 1974, and 1975 to 1978. He was on loan to the Northern Ireland Office from 1974 to 1975, and 1978 to 1980. In the Foreign and Commonwealth Office (FCO) he worked in the East African Department from 1980 to 1983.

During the Falklands War Huckle was a member of the Foreign Office Emergency Unit. Huckle worked at the United Kingdom's Consulate General in New York from 1983 to 1986. He was head of chancery in Manila from 1987 to 1990. From 1992 to 1996, he was deputy head of the United Kingdom's delegation to the Organization for Security and Co-operation in Europe.

=== Administrator ===
Huckle was based in Barbados while serving as head of the Dependent Territories Regional secretariat from 1996 to 1998. Huckle was made commissioner of the British Indian Ocean Territory in 2001, and resided in the United Kingdom while holding the position. From 2001 to 2004, Huckle was head of the Overseas Territories Department in the FCO. From 2004 to 2005, he was Governor of Anguilla.

In 2006, Huckle succeeded Howard Pearce as Governor of the Falkland Islands and Commissioner for South Georgia and the South Sandwich Islands. He appointed Robert Mark Titterington as Attorney General of the Falklands Islands on 28 February 2007, and Christopher James Ellis Gardner as Chief Justice of the Falkland Islands on 21 May. A new Constitution of the Falkland Islands was created during his tenure. Nigel Haywood was selected to succeed him as governor and commissioner in 2010.

== Later life ==
Huckle replaced David Tatham as head of the Falkland Islands Association on 10 December 2011. A memorial for the Falklands War was unveiled by Huckle in Brecon, Wales, on 7 October 2017.

== Personal life ==
Huckle married Helen, with whom he had two children.

== Works cited ==
=== Journals ===
- "Appointment of Attorney General" (PDF). Falkland Islands Gazette. 116 (3). 28 February 2007. Archived from the original on 5 May 2026.*
- "New Governor". Caribbean Update. 20 (6). Caribbean Update. 2004.

=== News ===
- "Alan Huckle appointed Falklands' Governor". Merco Press. 27 July 2005. Archived from the original on 5 May 2026.
- "Appointment: Governor of the Falkland Islands". The Times. 2 September 2009. Archived from the original on 5 May 2026.
- "Falklands War memorial unveiled in Brecon by ex governor Sir Alan Huckle". Merco Press. 10 October 2017. Archived from the original on 5 May 2026.
- "New Falklands Association chairman pays tribute to David Tatham and anticipates "a very busy 2012"". Merco Press. 21 December 2011. Archived from the original on 5 May 2026.
- "New Falklands constitution agreed". BBC News. 6 November 2008. Archived from the original on 5 May 2026.
- "No change in message from new Falklands Governor". Merco Press. 28 August 2006. Archived from the original on 5 May 2026.

=== Web ===
- "Diego Garcia: Footprint of Freedom?" (PDF). Bar Human Rights Committee. 2003. Archived (PDF) from the original on 5 May 2026.
- "King Edward Point Diary – April 2007". British Antarctic Survey. 30 April 2007. Archived from the original on 5 May 2026.

Government offices
Preceded by John White	Commissioner of the British Indian Ocean Territory and Commissioner of the British Antarctic Territory; 2001–2004	Succeeded by Tony Crombie
Preceded by Peter Johnstone	Governor of Anguilla; 2004–2006	Succeeded by Andrew George
Preceded by Howard Pearce	Governor of the Falkland Islands and Commissioner for South Georgia and the South Sandwich Islands; 2006–2010	Succeeded by Nigel Haywood
