= Jermaine Ale =

Australian rugby league footballer (born 1985)

Personal information
- Born: 22 May 1985 (age 41) Newcastle, New South Wales, Australia
- Height: 6 ft 0 in (1.83 m)

Playing information
- Position: Wing
Club
Years	Team	Pld	T	G	FG	P
2005	Canberra Raiders	4	1	0	0	4
Representative
Years	Team	Pld	T	G	FG	P
2005	Samoa	1	0	0	0	0

Jermaine Ale (born 22 May 1985) is an Australian former rugby league footballer who represented Samoa and played for the Canberra Raiders club in the National Rugby League competition. His position of choice was on the wing.

== Background ==
Ale was born in Newcastle, New South Wales, Australia.

While attending Lambton High School, Ale played for the Australian Schoolboys team in 2002.

== Playing career ==
Ale made his first grade debut for Canberra in round 15 of the 2005 NRL season against Canterbury. Ale played four games for the Canberra club.

In October 2005, Ale represented Samoa in a match against Tonga.

== Career playing statistics ==
=== Point scoring summary ===
Games	Tries	Goals	F/G	Points
4	0	-	-	4

=== Matches played ===
Team	Matches	Years
Canberra Raiders	4	2005–retired
