= Nicholay Finlayson =

Jamaican footballer (born 1985)

Personal information
- Date of birth: 19 December 1985 (age 40)
- Place of birth: Jamaica
- Height: 1.83 m (6 ft 0 in)
- Position: Defender

Team information
- Current team: Waterhouse
- Number: 8

Senior career*
Years	Team	Apps	(Gls)
2004–2009	Reno		
2009–2010	Waterhouse		
2010–2012	Reno	26	(4)
2012–	Waterhouse	65	(0)

International career^{‡}
2005–	Jamaica	14	(0)
- * Club domestic league appearances and goals as of 16 August 2014 ‡ National team caps and goals as of 16 August 2014

Nicholay Finlayson (born 19 December 1985), also spelled as Nicholy Fin(d)layson; is a Jamaican footballer who currently plays for Waterhouse F.C. as a defender.

== International career ==
Finlayson played his first international game with the senior national team in 2005, a match in which he was part of the starting squad and left the pitch after being substituted in the 52nd minute.

== Honours ==
Waterhouse

- JFF Champions Cup (1): 2013
