= Jermaine Lewis =

Jermaine Lewis may refer to:

- Jermaine Lewis (American football, born 1974), American football player in the National Football League
- Jermaine Lewis (American football, born 1979), American football player in the Arena football League
