= Ben Roberts (American football) =

American football player (born 1992)

Profile
- Position: Wide receiver

Personal information
- Born: September 7, 1992 (age 34); Missoula, Montana
- Listed height: 6 ft 0 in (1.83 m)
- Listed weight: 195 lb (88 kg)

Career information
- High school: Missoula (MT) Sentinel
- College: Montana
- NFL draft: 2016: undrafted

Career history
- Tennessee Titans (2016)*
- * Offseason or practice squad member only

Benjamin Romain Roberts (born September 7, 1992) is an American former football wide receiver. He played college football at Montana.

== Professional career ==
Roberts was signed by the Titans as an undrafted free agent on May 16, 2016. On September 4, 2016, he was signed to the Titans' practice squad. Two days later, he was released from their practice squad.
