= Tim Foy =

British territorial governor

Tim Foy CBE
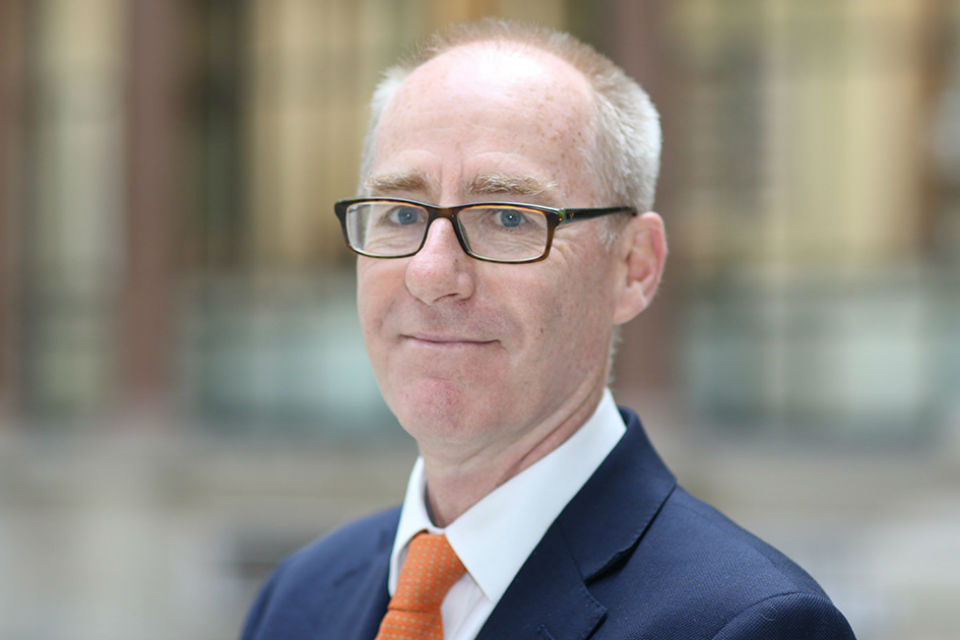

Governor of Anguilla
- In office August 2017 – 30 December 2020
- Monarch: Elizabeth II
- Preceded by: Christina Scott
- Succeeded by: Dileeni Daniel-Selvaratnam

Personal details
- Born: Timothy John Foy
- Spouse: Dina Foy
- Children: 2
- Occupation: Civil servant

Timothy John Foy CBE is a former British civil servant and territorial governor. He served as Governor of Anguilla from August 2017 through December 2020. During his inaugural address, he stated that economic development and improving public safety would be his key priorities as governor.

Prior to his governorship he served as a member of the UK Civil Service, holding positions in the Home Office, the Cabinet Office, and the Department for International Development (DFID). Between 2005 and 2006, he served as the Head of DFID in Iraq, and testified before the Chilcot Inquiry in 2010 on his experience of post-war reconstruction following the 2003 invasion of Iraq.

Already Officer of the Order of the British Empire (OBE), Foy was appointed Commander of the Order of the British Empire (CBE) in the 2022 Birthday Honours for public service.

He is married to Dr Dina Foy and has two children.

Government offices
Preceded by Christina Scott	Governor of Anguilla; 2017–2020	Succeeded by Dileeni Daniel-Selvaratnam
