= Jermaine Gumbs =

English-born Anguillan footballer

Personal information
- Date of birth: 5 May 1986 (age 40)
- Place of birth: Slough, England
- Position: Striker

Senior career*
Years	Team	Apps	(Gls)
2006–2007	Beaconsfield SYCOB		
2007–2008	Slough Town	19	(7)
2008	Windsor & Eton	3	(0)
2008–2009	Burnham		
2009–2010	Binfield		
2010	Hillingdon Borough	0	(0)
2010–2011	Uxbridge	7	(1)
2011–2012	Marlow	2	(0)
2012	Windsor		
2012	Amersham Town	1	(0)
2012–2013	Harefield United		
2014–2015	AFC Hayes	2	(0)

International career^{‡}
2008	Anguilla	2	(0)
- * Club domestic league appearances and goals as of 17:42, 26 April 2015 (UTC) ‡ National team caps and goals as of 17:42, 26 April 2015 (UTC)

Jermaine Gumbs (born 5 May 1986) is a footballer who plays as a striker. Born in England, he represented Anguilla at international level.

== Career ==
Born in Slough, Gumbs played for Beaconsfield SYCOB, Slough Town, Windsor & Eton, Binfield, Hillingdon Borough, Uxbridge, Marlow, Windsor, Burnham, Amersham Town, Harefield United and AFC Hayes.

He made two international appearances for Anguilla in 2008, both of which came in FIFA World Cup qualifying matches.

== Personal life ==
He is the cousin of fellow player Romell Gumbs.
