= Anthony Lee (actor) =

American actor and playwright (1961–2000)

- Anthony Lee in Liar Liar
- Born: Anthony Dwain Lee; July 17, 1961; Redding, California, U.S.
- Died: October 28, 2000 (aged 39); Los Angeles, California, U.S.
- Cause of death: Multiple gunshot wounds
- Education: Valley High School
- Occupation: Actor
- Spouse: Serena Scholl (m. 1988–1996)

Anthony Dwain Lee (July 17, 1961 – October 28, 2000) was an American actor and playwright. He began his career in the 1980s appearing in numerous stage productions, and in guest roles on television and in films.

While attending a Halloween party on October 28, 2000, Lee was fatally shot by a Los Angeles Police Department officer. Lee's death, and the circumstances surrounding it, garnered significant national and international media attention.

== Early life and career ==
Lee was born in Redding, California and grew up in a middle-class family in Sacramento where he attended Valley High School.

Lee began acting at the age of 20 in a community acting class that performed productions at retirement and assisted living homes. His first professional productions were at The Sacramento Theater Company. In 1986, he traveled to Ashland, Oregon and auditioned at the Oregon Shakespeare Festival (OSF) a nationally and internationally known Regional Equity theater. He was cast the following season at OSF with a ten month contract. Lee starred in Master Harold and the Boys, playing Willie, and had a lead role in a Carson McCullers' play. Lee met his future wife, Serena Scholl, also an actress, at OSF. They moved to Sacramento then to Seattle in 1988 where they married on August 8, 1988. The move was precipitated by Lee being cast by Tim Bond in, The Colored Museum, at The Empty Space Theater.

Lee continued working in stage productions at the Seattle Repertory Theatre. He appeared in The Cider House Rules as Mr. Rose, as Sweet Back in Spunk and in a role in A Raisin in the Sun. He also acted in The Kentucky Cycle at the Intiman Theatre, and appeared in productions of The Colored Museum, Uncle Vanya, The Meeting as Malcolm X, and as the lead character in Othello. He won the 1995 LAWeekly award for "Best Actor" in Mitch Hale's "Buffalo Soldier" at Theatre/Theater in Hollywood.

Lee's last onscreen appearance was on the Season 7 ER episode "Rescue Me" in which he portrayed a homeless man. The episode, which aired on November 23, 2000, is dedicated to him.

== Personal life ==
=== Religion ===
Lee was raised a Baptist, but began practicing Nichiren Buddhism with the Soka Gakkai International in 1986 in Sacramento. He and his wife, Serena Scholl, both practiced Buddhism with the SGI-USA and were active members and leaders, supporting other practitioners.

== Death ==
On October 28, 2000, Lee was attending a costume party in Benedict Canyon at a friend's mansion dubbed "The Castle". The LA Times reported that in the past Lee had worn a cape and mask to Halloween parties. Police reported he was carrying a replica of a .357 Magnum Desert Eagle handgun made of rubber. Sometime around 1:00 a.m, two LAPD officers, Officer Terrill Hopper and Officer Natalie Humpherys, responded to a noise complaint at the residence. The two were met by a private security guard hired by one of the party's hosts. The security guard showed the officers to the kitchen and left them to find one of the party's hosts.

Before the party hosts could be found, Officer Hopper left the kitchen, exiting through a side door. He searched the darkened, narrow path area behind the home with his flashlight before coming upon a glass door. Behind the door stood Lee and his friend, fellow actor Jeff Denton. The two were in Denton's bedroom chatting with another actor when they saw Officer Hopper's flashlight shine through the glass door. Officer Hopper then shot through the glass door nine times, hitting Lee a total of four times, once in the head and three times in the back. Lee was killed instantly. Officer Hopper later said he fired his weapon because Lee aimed his replica gun at him, and he was unaware that the gun was not real.

== Autopsy findings and lawsuits ==
On October 30, 2000, Bernard C. Parks, who was then the chief of the LAPD, held a press conference to address the events surrounding Lee's shooting. Parks maintained that Officer Hopper acted in self-defense and that Lee was pointing the replica gun "in a very direct location" towards Officer Hopper. Parks also showed a replica gun that Lee was carrying at the time of the shooting, comparing it to a real Desert Eagle. The replica reportedly appeared to be a near match.

On December 4, 2000, the results of Lee's autopsy were released. The autopsy determined that Lee was struck once in the back of the head and three times in the back. The LAPD had reported that Lee had been facing Hopper, aiming his replica gun at him. A toxicology report showed that Lee had alcohol and cocaine in his system at the time of his death.

On December 11, 2000, attorney Johnnie Cochran filed a $100 million wrongful death lawsuit against the LAPD on behalf of Lee's family. Cochran stated that the "LAPD has never seen a shooting they didn't think they could justify." During a press conference held the same day, Cochran referred to Lee's autopsy report that showed the actor had been shot in the back of the head and in the back as proof that Officer Hopper's version of events was false. Chief Parks said the positioning of Lee's wounds was likely sustained when Lee ducked or moved when he saw Officer Hopper's gun or was fired upon. Cochran dismissed Park's theory stating that it was, "So improbable. We have asked our experts about that, and it is very, very improbable." Cochran also dismissed Officer Hopper's claim that he was unaware that the alleged gun was fake. Cochran stated, "Witnesses said this was a replica gun, and if you know replicas, they have those little orange tips on them so people who come in contact with them who are trained become aware."

Two other party attendants filed lawsuits against the LAPD. Jeff Denton, Lee's friend and one of the house's occupants, was standing next to the actor in his bedroom when Lee was shot. He claimed he suffered post-traumatic stress. Will Frey, another party attendant, also filed suit.

The suit filed by Tina Lee-Vogt, Lee's sister and only surviving immediate family, never came to trial because the security guards working at the party – the key witnesses – could not be found by Cochran's office by the trial date. In February 2003, the LAPD settled with Lee-Vogt for $225,000.

== Investigation ==
The LAPD and L.A. County D.A. Steve Cooley both launched investigations to determine if Officer Hopper's actions were in line with policy. According to Officer Hopper, while he was searching the area outside the home, he noticed one party attendant standing outside looking "intently" through a glass door. Officer Hopper approached the man and looked through the door to see Lee and his friends talking in what Officer Hopper described as a "very dimly lit room". Lee was standing in front of Officer Hopper slightly to the left wearing his devil mask on top of his head. Officer Hopper stated that when he shined his flashlight into the room, he saw what he suspected to be a drug deal transpiring. Officer Hopper accounted the rest of the events during his interview with investigators:

The male Black (Lee) turns and looks toward the glass door where I'm positioned... He looks directly at me and we make eye contact. Almost simultaneously, upon making eye contact, he reached for his waistband...with his right hand...and removed a blue steel semi-automatic handgun...at which point, fearing for my life, I drew my weapon from my holster and, after he removed the gun he pointed the weapon, his gun, right at me and fearful for my safety and my life I fired my weapon, my service weapon...During this entire time, it happened very, very quickly, his gun was continually pointing at me...I fired my weapon, continually assessing the situation, and it was very, very rapid and I fired...and he never dropped the weapon...he never made an attempt to drop the weapon or anything. The weapon stayed pointed toward me...while firing, I'm moving backwards toward a position of cover and, as this is happening, I recognize that my weapon is out of battery.

In conjunction with their investigation, the LAPD employed an expert who created a computer reenactment based on physical evidence of the shooting. According to the LAPD, the reenactment supported Officer Hopper's version of events. In October 2001, the LAPD internal review board ruled that Officer Hopper's actions were justifiable and he was "in policy" using deadly force. According to LAPD officials, the board also recommended that Officer Hopper seek additional training to "improve his tactics".

== Aftermath ==
Some of Lee's friends and family continue to dispute the LAPD's version of events. Lee's sister, Tina Lee-Vogt, doubted the ruling due to Lee's autopsy report which determined he was shot in the back multiple times.

Friends of Lee maintain that the actor's death was not a mistake and that he was a victim of LAPD ineptitude. Other friends maintained that Lee would not have pointed a weapon, real or fake.

Lee's shooting drew more criticism to the LAPD at a time when the department's reputation was already suffering due to widespread police brutality, corruption and civil rights violations.

The circumstances surrounding Lee's death drew nationwide media attention. Lee's story was later featured on 48 Hours.

== Filmography ==
Year	Title	Role	Notes
1986	Fortune Dane	Special Officer in Garage	Episode: "Fortune Dane"
1989	At a Loose End?	Mountain Man	
1991	Face of a Stranger	Emergency Doctor	Television movie
1996	Dr. Quinn, Medicine Woman	Curtis Roper	Episode: "The Iceman Cometh"
1996	American Strays	Omar	
1996	NYPD Blue	Jerome	Episode: "Where's 'Swaldo"
1997	The Second Civil War	Steven Kingsley	HBO film
1997	Liar Liar	Fred	
1997	Brooklyn South	Reverend Basil Matheson	3 episodes
1998	The Magnificent Seven	Guard Phillips	Episode: "Inmate 78"
1998	Arliss	Dwayne's Brother	Episode: "The Family Trust"
1998	Any Day Now	Michael Gardner	2 episodes
1999	Chicago Hope	John	Episode: "From Here to Maternity"
2000	Little Richard		Television movie
2000	Waterproof	'Brother Big' Battle	
2000	ER	Mr. Florea	Episode: "Rescue Me"
