= Peter Johnstone (diplomat) =

British politician (born 1944)

Peter Johnstone CMG (born 30 July 1944) was the governor of Anguilla from 4 February 2000 until 29 July 2004.

Government offices
Preceded by Robert Harris	Governor of Anguilla; 2000–2004	Succeeded by Alan Huckle
