= Brian Canty =

British diplomat (1931–2024)

Brian George John Canty, CBE (23 October 1931 – 3 March 2024) was a British diplomat who served as Governor of Anguilla from 1989 to 1992. He was the designer of Anguilla's flag, which was first flown in 1990. He served as Deputy Governor of Bermuda from 1986 to 1989 under Governor Viscount Dunrossil and later Sir Desmond Langley and was Acting Governor of Bermuda during Hurricane Emily in September 1987.

Canty was appointed an OBE in 1988 and promoted to CBE in 1993.

Canty died on 3 March 2024, at the age of 92.
