= Jermain Hollis =

Footballer (born 1986)

Personal information
- Full name: Jermain Phydell Hollis
- Date of birth: 7 October 1986 (age 40)
- Place of birth: Nottingham, England
- Height: 5 ft 10 in (1.78 m)
- Position: Midfielder

Team information
- Current team: Long Eaton United

Senior career*
Years	Team	Apps	(Gls)
20??–2004	Eastwood Town		
2004–2006	Kidderminster Harriers	1	(0)
2005–2006	→ Alvechurch (loan)		(1)
2006–2007	Hucknall Town	9	
2007–2008	Gresley Rovers	21	(1)
2008–2009	Rainworth Miners Welfare		
2010	Eastwood Town		
2010–2011	Rainworth Miners Welfare		
2011	Carlton Town	36	(3)
2011–2012	Hucknall Town	5	(1)
2012	Shepshed Dynamo		
2012	Rainworth Miners Welfare		
2015	Basford United		
2014–2015	Long Eaton United		
2015	Basford United		
2016–2017	Belper Town		
2017	Grantham Town		
2017–2018	Coalville Town		
2018	Hednesford Town		
2018–2020	Ilkeston Town		
2020	Newark Flowserve		
2020–2022	Eastwood		
2022–	Long Eaton United		

International career
2004–2006	Jamaica U20		
- * Club domestic league appearances and goals

Jermain Phydell Hollis (born 7 October 1986) is a footballer who played in the Football League for Kidderminster Harriers, and in non-league football for clubs including Eastwood Town, Alvechurch and Hucknall Town. He plays for Long Eaton United. Born in England, he played for the Jamaica U20 national team at international level.

== Playing career ==
Hollis signed for Hednesford Town on 25 May 2018. On 17 November 2018, Hollis signed for Ilkeston Town.

== International career ==
Hollis was born in Nottingham, England, but represented Jamaica at under-20 level. He played at the 2005 CONCACAF U-20 Tournament, which doubled as the qualifying process for the 2005 FIFA World Youth Championship, and at the 2006 Central American and Caribbean Games.
