= Governor of Anguilla =

- Coat of arms of Anguilla

- Flag of the governor of Anguilla

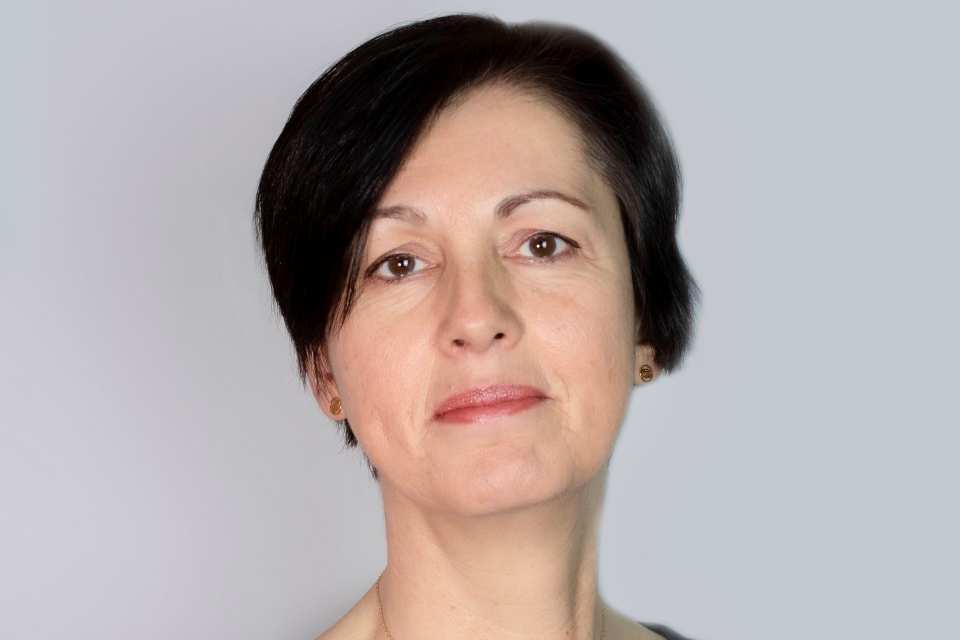
- Incumbent; Julia Crouch since 11 September 2023
- Style: Her Excellency
- Residence: Government House, Anguilla
- Appointer: King Charles III; as King of the United Kingdom
- Term length: At His Majesty's pleasure
- Formation: 1982
- First holder: Charles Godden
- Deputy: Deputy Governor of Anguilla
- Website: Office of the Governor

The governor of Anguilla is the representative of the monarch in the British Overseas Territory of Anguilla. The governor is appointed by the monarch on the advice of the Government of the United Kingdom. The governor is the highest authority on Anguilla, but daily business is handled by local Anguillan elected officials. The main role of the governor is to appoint the premier of Anguilla.

The governor's official residence is Government House at Old Ta. The governor has her own flag: the Union Flag defaced with the coat of arms of Anguilla.

The current governor is Julia Crouch, who was sworn in on 11 September 2023.

== List of governors of Anguilla ==
- 1982–83: Charles Henry Godden
- 1983–87: Alastair Turner Baillie
- 1987–89: Geoffrey Owen Whittaker
- 1989–92: Brian George John Canty
- 1992–95: Alan William Shave
- 1995–96: Alan Hoole
- 1996–2000: Robert Harris
- 2000–04: Peter Johnstone
- 2004–06: Alan Huckle
- 2006–09: Andrew George
- 2009–13: Alistair Harrison
- 2013–17: Christina Scott
- 2017–20: Tim Foy
- 2021–23: Dileeni Daniel-Selvaratnam
- 2023–present: Julia Crouch

== See also ==
- List of colonial governors and administrators of Anguilla
