= Alan William Shave =

Former Governor of Anguilla

Alan William Shave, CVO, OBE (born 3 November 1936) is a retired British journalist and diplomat. He was Governor of Anguilla from 1992 to 1995.
