= Benjamin Gumbs II =

British colonial governor (died 1768)

Benjamin Gumbs II (died 1768) was a British colonial governor and sugarcane plantation owner on Katouche Bay. He was Deputy Governor of Anguilla from 1750 until 1768.

Preceded by John Welch	Deputy Governor of Anguilla; 1750–1768	Succeeded by Benjamin Roberts
