= Alistair Harrison =

British diplomat and politician (born 1954)

Alistair Harrison CMG CVO
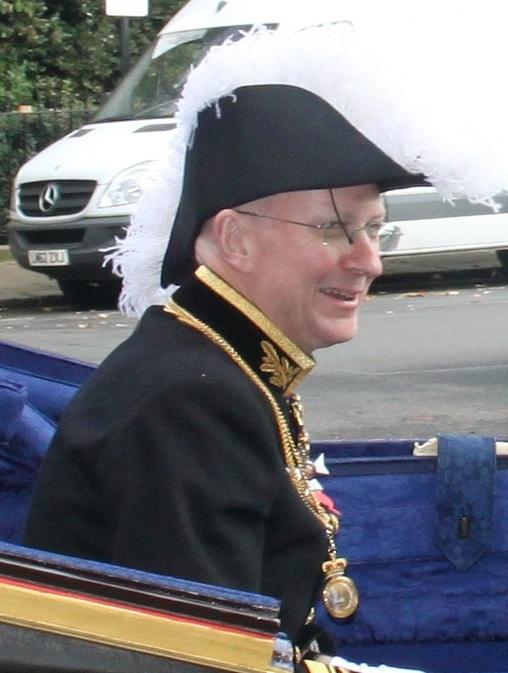
- Harrison in 2014

Governor of Anguilla
- In office 21 April 2009 – 23 July 2013
- Monarch: Elizabeth II
- Premier: Osbourne Fleming; Hubert Hughes
- Preceded by: Stanley Reid (Acting)
- Succeeded by: Christina Scott

Personal details
- Born: 14 November 1954 (age 71) Guisborough, North Yorkshire, England, UK
- Spouse: Sarah Wood
- Education: University College, Oxford; University of London

William Alistair Harrison CMG CVO (born 14 November 1954) is His Majesty's Marshal of the Diplomatic Corps. He was previously Governor of Anguilla from 21 April 2009 to 23 July 2013.

== Early life ==
Harrison was born on 14 November 1954 in Guisborough, North Yorkshire, in the United Kingdom. He studied at the Royal Grammar School, Newcastle. He then went on to read Literae Humaniores at University College, Oxford, graduating in 1977. In 1995, he has also gained a Diploma in Economics at the University of London.

== Diplomatic career ==
In 1977, he joined Her Majesty's Diplomatic Service. He first worked in the NATO Section of the Defence Department of Foreign and Commonwealth Office. He had Polish language training in 1978. He was posted to Warsaw, Poland between 1979 and 1982. He was a Private Secretary to Parliamentary Under-Secretary of the Foreign and Commonwealth Office from 1984 to 1986. From 1987 till 1992, he was based in New York City as part of the UK Mission to the United Nations. He returned to London and became Deputy Head of the Middle East Department at the Foreign and Commonwealth Office, a position that he held until 1995 when he was once more posted to Warsaw, Poland. He then worked as a Foreign Policy Adviser to the European Commission in Brussels, Belgium, from 1998 to 2000.

Harrison once more joined the UK Mission to the United Nations in 2000. With this experience, he returned to the Foreign Office in London to head the United Nations Department between 2003 and 2005. From 2005, he held the position of High Commissioner to Zambia. In 2008–09, he was Head of the Zimbabwe Unit at the Foreign Office. In April 2009, he became the Governor of Anguilla. In 2014, he became HM Marshal of the Diplomatic Corps.

== Honours ==
On 25 March 1996, Harrison was appointed Commander of the Royal Victorian Order (CVO). He was appointed Companion of the Order of St Michael and St George (CMG) in the 2012 Birthday Honours. In 2020, he received Bene Merito honorary badge of the Minister of Foreign Affairs of Poland.

== Personal life ==
Harrison's first wife was Theresa Mary (née Morrison). They were married from 1981 to 1991, when their marriage was dissolved. In 1996 he married Sarah Judith (née Wood). The couple have three children.

Government offices
Preceded by Andrew George	Governor of Anguilla; 2009–2013	Succeeded by Christina Scott
