= Alastair Turner Baillie =

British diplomat (1932–2009)

Alastair Turner Baillie (24 December 1932 – 18 November 2009) was a British diplomat. He served as Governor of Anguilla from 1983 to 1987.
