= List of Important Bird Areas in Anguilla =

The island of Anguilla is home to 16 Important Bird Areas, as designated by BirdLife International.

== IBAs ==
- Cauls Pond
- Cove Pond
- Dog Island
- Forest Bay Pond
- Grey Pond
- Katouche Canyon
- Long Salt Pond
- Meads Bay Pond
- Merrywing Pond System
- Mimi Bay
- Prickly Pear (East and West)
- Rendezvous Bay Pond
- Road Salt Pond
- Scrub Island
- Sombrero
- West End Pond
