= North Hill =

North Hill may refer to:

== Anguilla ==
- North Hill, Anguilla, a district

== United Kingdom ==
- North Hill, Cornwall, a village in England
- North Hill, Malvern, an elevation
- North Hill, Orkney, an RSPB nature reserve

== United States ==
- North Hill (Riverside, California), a hill
- North Hill (Plymouth), a neighborhood in Plymouth, Massachusetts
- North Hill, Minot, North Dakota, a neighborhood
- North Hill Historic District (disambiguation), two places
- North Hill Preservation District, Pensacola, Florida
- North Hill, a neighborhood in Akron, Ohio

== See also ==
- North Hills (disambiguation)
