= Patricia J. Adams =

Anguillan writer and former teacher

- Born: Patricia Juliette Christian; 1952 (age 73–74); The Farrington, Anguilla
- Occupations: teacher, writer
- Years active: 1969-present

Patricia J. Adams (born 1952) is an Anguillan writer and former teacher. An annual award which bears her name is given each year by Anguilla’s Department of Education to the primary students in grades 3, 5, and 6 who excel in creative writing. She was the recipient of the Queen's Certificate and a badge of honour in 2012 on Anguilla Day.

== Early life ==
Patricia Juliette Christian was born January 3, 1952, in the Farrington area of Anguilla to Ann Juliette and Malcolm Lindbergh Christian. Her parents were of African heritage. Christian was the oldest of five siblings and the only girl. Her family moved to St. Martin in her childhood and Christian was raised by her grandmother. She attended Valley Girls' School and Valley Secondary School, completing her high school education in 1969. The year she graduated was a tumultuous year for the country with its secession from the Saint Christopher-Nevis-Anguilla colony and Britain's invasion of Anguilla to reassert its authority.

== Career ==
Christian began writing around the time of her graduation, but found very little support from Anguillan writers. She wrote a poem about what Anguillans refer to as the Anguillan Revolution, discussing how Landsome, an area that had been for elite members of Anguillan society became the home of army soldiers. She could not find a publisher, and so would just write and throw away her work. In 1969 she began working in the capital, The Valley, at the first public radio station on the island, Radio Anguilla 95.5 FM. She was one of the pioneering broadcasters that transformed the station into a community media producer which brought information and education to the listeners. In 1972 Christian married Calvin B. Adams and the couple subsequently had five children. She left the radio station in 1973, returning to work as a bank clerk and telephone operator in 1977. In 1981, Adams returned to broadcasting, announcing for the Caribbean Beacon.

In 1987, Adams began working as a primary school teacher, which allowed her to develop as a writer. During teaching career, she wrote children's stories, plays, poetry and songs, two of which, "Oh Anguilla" and "This Is Anguilla", gained wide performance even above the national anthem. In 1989, she moved to St. Kitts to earn her teaching certificate and completed her studies at the St. Kitts-Nevis Teacher Training College in 1991. In 1994, during the royal visit of Queen Elizabeth II, both of her songs were performed for the queen by a children's choir.

"Dey cut out my whole tongue
An' give me half a tongue,
Dey hoodwink me from learning dem tongue.
Dis sweet tongue
Dat roll off it own proverbs.
Dis sweet tongue
Dat invent it own nungs and pronungs.
An put words togedder
To make musical sentences.".

—Patricia J. Adams, excerpt (1st stanza) of her poem "My Tongue".

Adams published, Windows to Yesteryear, her first collection of poems in 1998 and her second collection, A Gift of Fire: Cultural Writings to Enlighten and Amuse was published in 2003. Her play "The Anguilla Revolution" was produced in 2004 on the 35th anniversary of the British invasion. A Jewel Made of Sand was published in 2006. Her works which feature both English and Anguillian Creole texts, have helped to improve the perception of the localcreole on the island, which was viewed more negatively and seldom used in writing in the past. Adams was influenced by Louise Bennett, the Jamaican poet, and inspired not only to write her own works, but to teach the Creole language of Anguilla as well as standard English, and to encourage her students to be proud of their first language. She retired from teaching in 2005.

Since 2008, the Patricia J. Adams Literary Award is given to primary students in grades 3, 5, and 6 who excel in compositional writing by the Department of Education. In 2012, when Anguilla held its first literary festival, Adams and her son Dwayne Adams were featured presenters. The same year she received a badge of honor and Queen's Certificate on Anguilla Day Award for her contributions to the social development of the island. In 2015, an anthology, Where I See the Sun—Contemporary Poetry in Anguilla, edited by Lasana M. Sekou included selections from Adams, among other poets from the island. Adams published her first novel, also in Anguilla’s Creole language, in 2016. The book, which is titled “Blue Beans” is about relationships between fathers and sons and takes place in the decade preceding the Anguillan Revolution. Upon its publication, a celebratory gathering was hosted by the Ministry of Youth and Culture, where Adams was praised for her literary body of work which has helped to document and preserve many of the cultural traditions of Anguilla. “Blue Beans” was followed by a sequel titled “Yellow Dad.”
