= Geography of Anguilla =

Anguilla
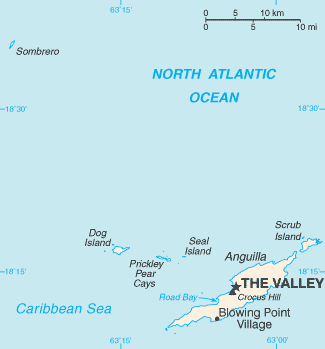
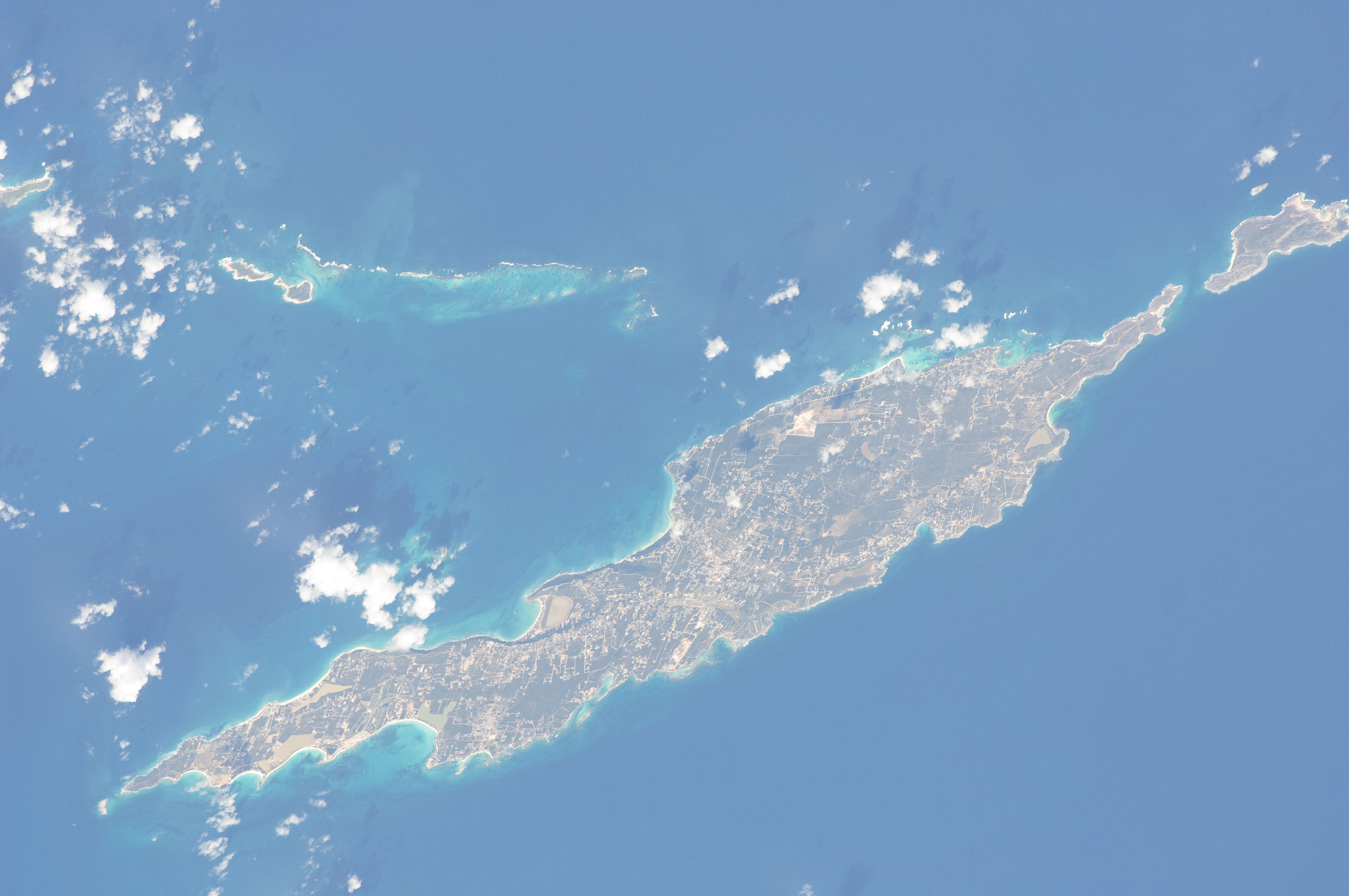
Continent	North America
Subregion	Caribbean
Geographic coordinates	18°15′N 63°10′W
Area: Total; Water	Ranked 227th 91 km² 0 km
Coastline	61 km
Land boundaries	0 km
Highest point	Crocus Hill, 73 m
Lowest point	Caribbean Sea, 0 m
Largest inland body of water	Road Bay Pond
Land Use: Arable land; Permanent crops; Other	0% 0% 100% (2012 est.)
Climate:	tropical; moderated by northeast trade winds
Terrain:	flat and low-lying island of coral and limestone
Natural resources	salt, fish, lobster
Natural hazards	hurricanes, tropical storms (June to November)
Environmental issues	low water supplies

Anguilla is an island in the Leeward Islands. It has numerous bays, including Barnes, Little, Rendezvous, Shoal, and Road Bays.

== Statistics ==
Location: Caribbean, island in the Caribbean Sea, east of Puerto Rico

Geographic coordinates: 18°15′ N, 63°10′ W

Map references: Central America and the Caribbean

Area:

- total: 91 km^{2} (35 sq mi)
- land: 91 km^{2} (35 sq mi)
- water: 0 km^{2} (0 sq mi)

Area – comparative: about half the size of Washington, D.C.

Coastline: 61 km

Maritime claims:

- exclusive fishing zone: 200 nmi (370.4 km; 230.2 mi)
- territorial sea: 3 nmi (5.6 km; 3.5 mi)

Climate: tropical moderated by northeast trade winds

Terrain: flat and low-lying island of coral and limestone

Elevation extremes:

- lowest point: Caribbean Sea 0 m
- highest point: Crocus Hill 73 m

Natural resources: salt, fish, lobster

Land use:

- arable land: 0%
- permanent crops: 0%
- permanent pastures: 0%
- forests and woodland: 61.1%
- other: 38.9% (mostly rock with some commercial salt ponds)

Natural hazards: frequent hurricanes and other tropical storms (July to October)

Environment – current issues: supplies of potable water sometimes cannot meet increasing demand largely because of poor distribution system.

== Islands and cays ==
Anguilla islands and cays

The territory of Anguilla consists of the island of Anguilla itself (by far the largest), as well as numerous other islands and cays, most of which are very small and uninhabited. These include:

- Anguillita
- Blowing Rock
- Cove Cay
- Crocus Cay
- Deadman's Cay
- Dog Island
- East Cay
- Little Island
- Little Scrub Island
- Mid Cay
- North Cay
- Prickly Pear Cays
- Rabbit Island
- Sandy Island, also known as Sand Island
- Scilly Cay
- Scrub Island
- Seal Island
- Sombrero, also known as Hat Island
- South Cay
- South Wager Island
- West Cay

== Districts ==
Anguilla is divided into fourteen districts:

Map of the 14 districts of Anguilla

District	Population (2011)
Blowing Point	825
East End	661
George Hill	1124
Island Harbour	963
North Hill	444
North Side	1514
Sandy Ground	252
Sandy Hill	633
South Hill	1689
Stoney Ground	1577
The Farrington	629
The Quarter	1079
The Valley	1298
West End	884

== Climate ==
Anguilla features a tropical wet and dry climate under the Köppen climate classification. The island has a rather dry climate, moderated by northeast trade winds. Temperatures vary little throughout the year. Average daily maxima range from about 27 °C (80.6 °F) in December to 30 °C (86 °F) in July. With no mountains to slow or trap clouds, rainfall is erratic, averaging about 900 mm (35.4 in) per year, the wettest months being September and October, and the driest February and March. Anguilla is vulnerable to hurricanes from June to November, peak season August to mid-October. The island suffered damage from Hurricane Luis in 1995, severe flooding of 1.5 to 6 metres (5 to 19.5 feet) from Hurricane Lenny in 1999 and severe damage from Hurricane Irma in 2017, which remains the most powerful hurricane to hit the island.

Climate data for The Valley – capital of Anguilla
Month	Jan	Feb	Mar	Apr	May	Jun	Jul	Aug	Sep	Oct	Nov	Dec	Year
Mean daily maximum °C (°F)	28 (82)	28 (82)	28 (82)	28 (82)	30 (86)	31 (88)	31 (88)	31 (88)	31 (88)	30 (86)	29 (84)	28 (82)	30 (86)
Daily mean °C (°F)	26 (79)	26 (79)	26 (79)	27 (81)	27 (81)	28 (82)	29 (84)	29 (84)	29 (84)	28 (82)	27 (81)	26 (79)	27 (81)
Mean daily minimum °C (°F)	23 (73)	23 (73)	23 (73)	25 (77)	25 (77)	26 (79)	26 (79)	26 (79)	26 (79)	26 (79)	25 (77)	24 (75)	23 (73)
Average precipitation cm (inches)	7 (2.8)	4 (1.6)	4 (1.6)	7 (2.8)	9 (3.5)	7 (2.8)	8 (3.1)	11 (4.3)	11 (4.3)	9 (3.5)	11 (4.3)	9 (3.5)	102 (40)
Source: Weatherbase

== Vegetation ==
Anguilla's coral and limestone terrain provide no subsistence possibilities for forests, woodland, pastures, crops, or arable lands. Its dry climate and thin soil hamper commercial agricultural development. In Anguilla forest cover is around 61% of the total land area, equivalent to 5,500 hectares (ha) of forest in 2020, which was unchanged from 1990.

== See also ==
- Wikimedia Atlas of Anguilla
