= Radio Anguilla =

- The Valley; Anguilla
- Frequency: 95.5 FM

Programming
- Language: English

Ownership
- Owner: Government of Anguilla

History
- First air date: April 6, 1969

Radio Anguilla is a publicly owned radio station broadcasting to the British Overseas Territory of Anguilla from studios in The Valley on 95.5 FM. The station is owned and operated by the Government of Anguilla and is the oldest radio station broadcasting to Anguilla.

== History ==
Radio Anguilla launched on April 6, 1969, and was the first radio station in Anguilla. The original transmitting equipment was provided by the British Government.

== Programming ==
The daily schedule of Radio Anguilla consists of a mixture of music, talk and religious programming.

== Transmitters ==
Radio Anguilla is broadcast from the Crocus Hill transmitting station on the island. The transmitter was upgraded in 2019 and radiates 3kW.
