= Grey Pond =

Brackish lagoon on Anguilla

- Location within Anguilla Location within the Caribbean
- Interactive map of Grey Pond
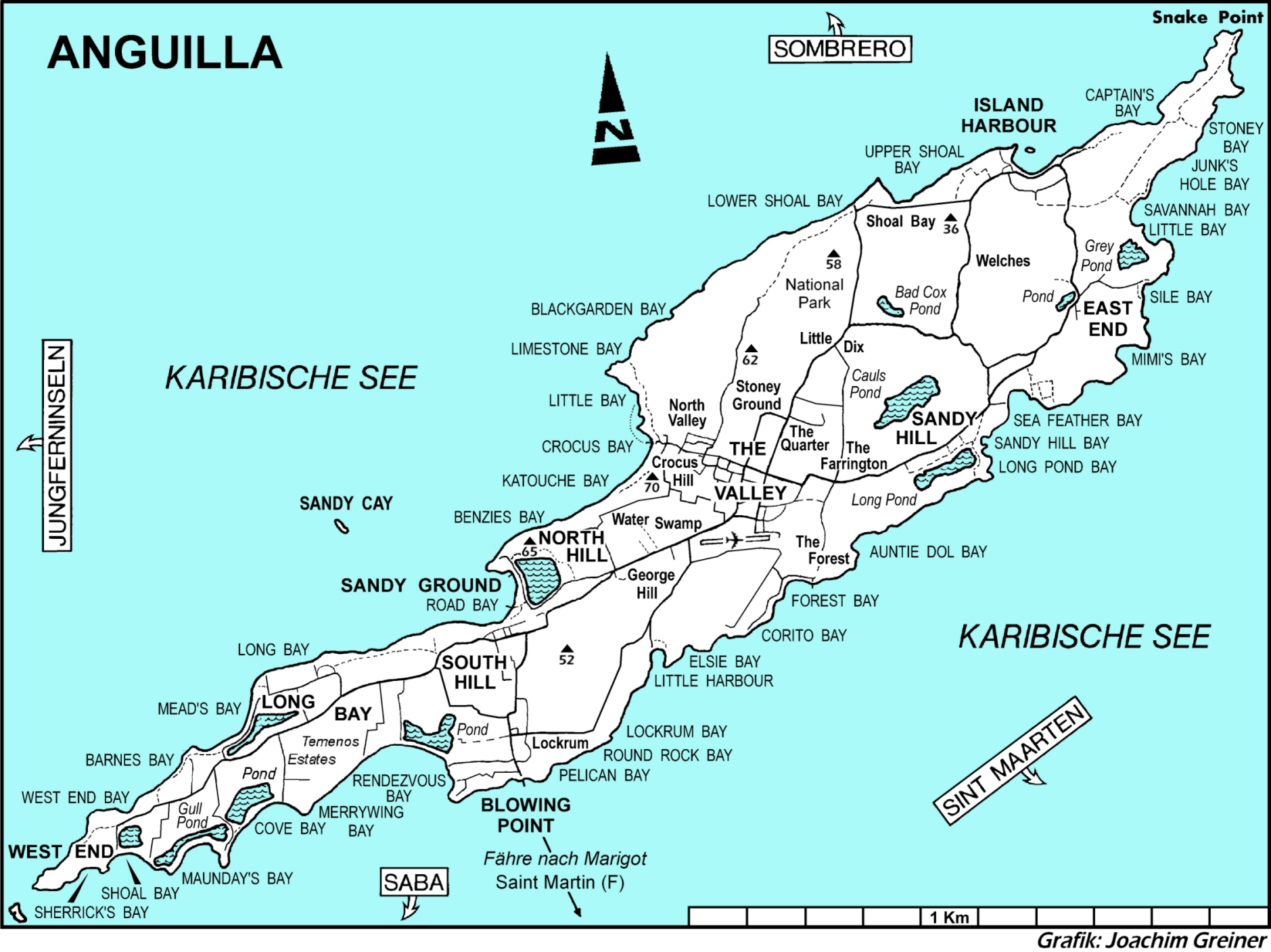
- Map of Anguilla
- Location: East End
- Coordinates: 18°14′34″N 62°59′12″W
- Type: Lagoon
- Ocean/sea sources: Caribbean
- Basin countries: Anguilla
- Surface area: 191 hectares (470 acres)
- Surface elevation: 2 metres (6 ft 7 in)
- Settlements: Mount Fortune

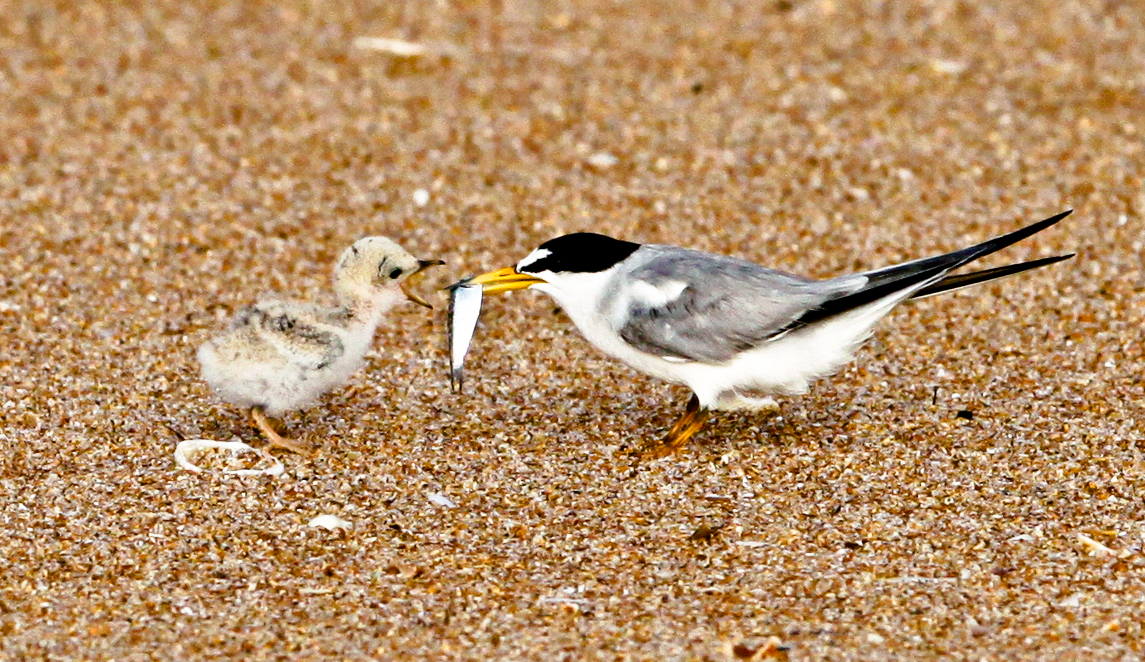
The lagoon is an important breeding site for least terns

Grey Pond is a 191 hectares (470 acres) shallow, brackish lagoon at the eastern end of the main island of Anguilla, a British Overseas Territory in the Caribbean. Its southern and eastern shores are relatively steep-sided limestone slopes, while its north-eastern corner is separated from Savannah Bay by a belt of sand dunes. The limestone shores are covered by low, scrub vegetation.

== Birds ==
The site has been identified as an Important Bird Area by BirdLife International mainly because, between April and September, it is an important nesting and roosting site for least terns. Other wetland birds which breed at the site include white-cheeked pintails, black-necked stilts, snowy plovers and willets. Breeding land birds include restricted-range green-throated caribs and Caribbean elaenias.
