= St. Gerard Church, The Valley =

Church in Anguilla

St. Gerard Church
- St. Gerard Church
- 18°12′36″N 63°03′16″W
- Location: The Valley
- Country: Anguilla; United Kingdom
- Denomination: Roman Catholic Church

St. Gerard Church is a religious building located in the town of The Valley, capital of the British overseas territory of Anguilla, in the Lesser Antilles, Caribbean Sea.

The temple follows the Roman or Latin rite and depends on the Roman Catholic Diocese of Saint John's – Basseterre (Dioecesis Sancti Ioannis Imatellurana) which was created in 1971 by Pope Paul VI by the Bull "Cum nobis" and is headquartered in the city of St. John's in Antigua and Barbuda.

The Catholic community organised in this place dates back to 1948 when a small chapel was built; the structure was destroyed by a hurricane in 1961. Catholics gathered at the site known as Wallblake House until 1966 when the present church was completed.

== See also ==
- Roman Catholicism in the United Kingdom
- Saint Gerard
