= Cauls Pond =

Wetland in Anguilla

Coordinates: 18°13′23″N 63°01′19″W

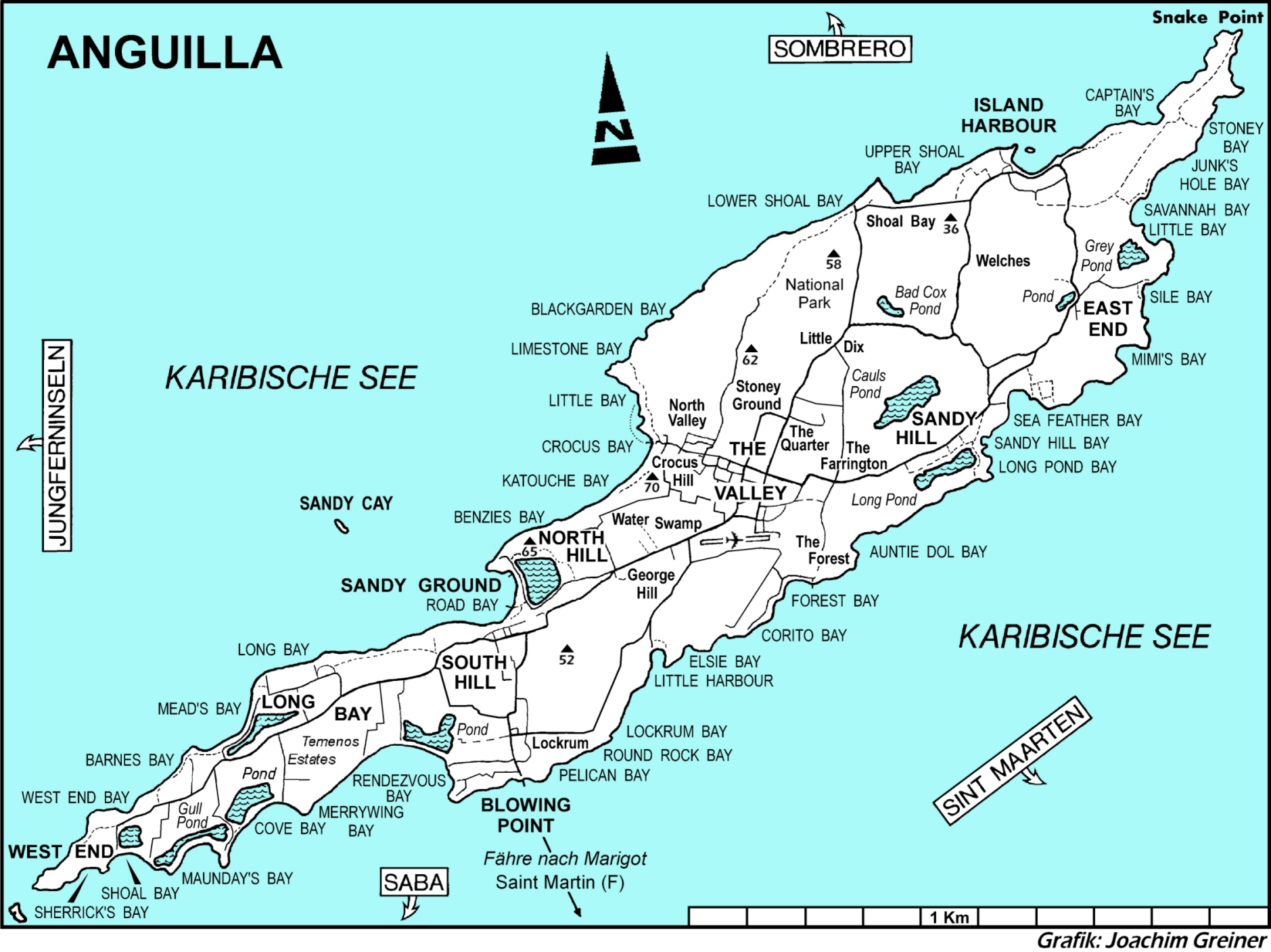
Map of Anguilla showing the pond near Sandy Hill on the south-east coast

Cauls Pond is a wetland in Anguilla, a British Overseas Territory in the Caribbean Sea. It is one of the territory's Important Bird Areas (IBAs).

== Description ==
Cauls Pond is a rectangular brackish lagoon in the Sandy Hill district, near the south-east coast of the island. The second largest enclosed body of water in Anguilla, it lies beneath sea level and has a relatively large catchment. The substrate is mostly limestone with marl at its western end. It contains a small mudflat island. The vegetation around the edge of the pond consists of cacti and buttonwood mangroves, with other trees and shrubs growing behind them.

=== Birds ===
The 43 ha IBA, consisting of the pond and its immediate surroundings, was identified as such by BirdLife International because it supports a breeding colony of least terns as well as populations of brown pelicans, laughing gulls, green-throated caribs, Caribbean elaenias, pearly-eyed thrashers and Lesser Antillean bullfinches.
