= Stoney Ground =

- District
- Location within Anguilla
- Coordinates: 18°13′16.32″N 63°2′51.12″W
- Country: United Kingdom
- Overseas Territory: Anguilla

Area
  - Land: 2.87 sq mi (7.43 km^{2})

Population (2011)
  - Total: 1,549

Stoney Ground is one of the fourteen Districts of Anguilla. Its population at the 2011 census was 1,549.

== Education ==
There is one government school in the town, Orealia Kelly Primary School (previously named Stoney Ground Primary School). Albena Lake-Hodge Comprehensive School in The Valley serves secondary students.

== Demographics ==
Historical population

Year	Pop.	±%
1974	713	—
1994	949	+33.1%

Year	Pop.	±%
2001	1,133	+19.4%
2011	1,549	+36.7%

Source: Statoids.com
