= Road Salt Pond =

Wetland in Anguilla

Coordinates: 18°12′12″N 63°05′23″W

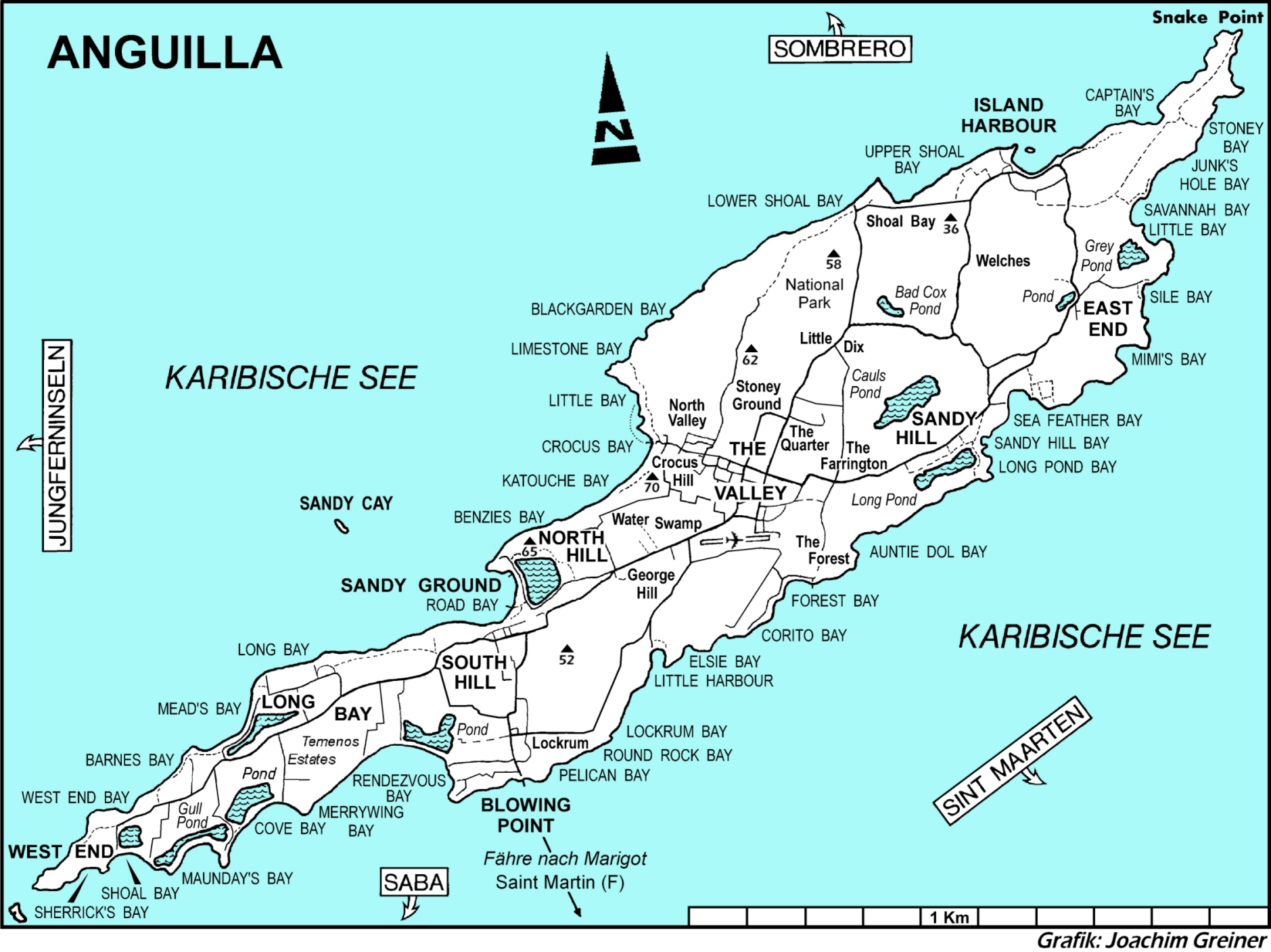
Map of Anguilla showing the pond at Road Bay on the north-west coast

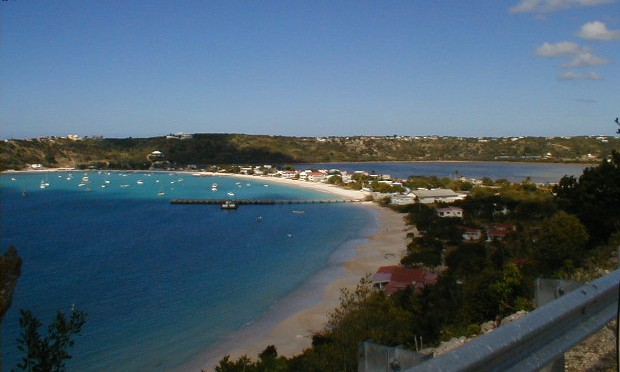
Sandy Ground view with the pond visible on the right behind the strip of housing along the Road Bay beach

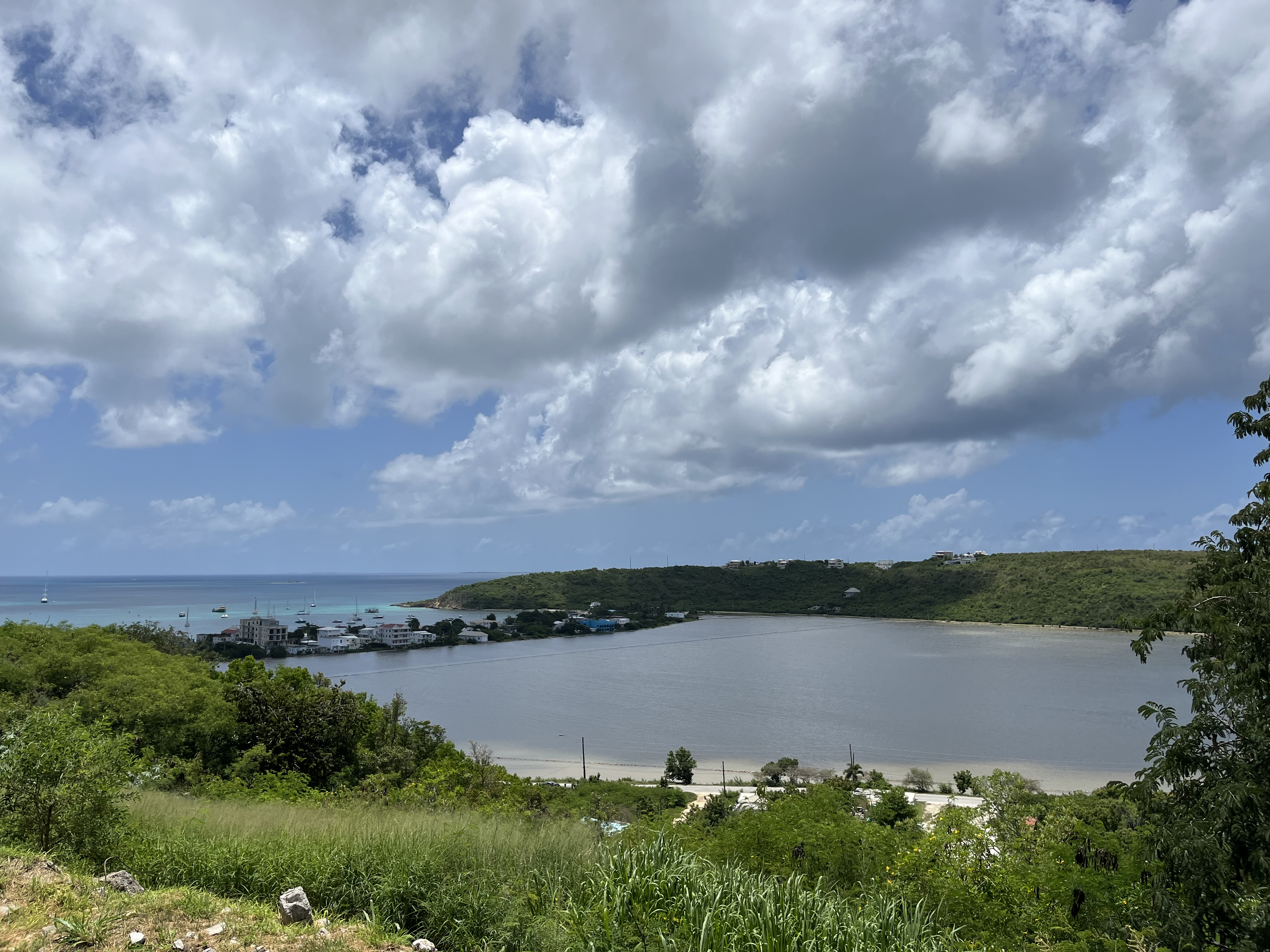
Road Salt Pond

Road Salt Pond, also known as Road Bay Pond or simply Road Pond, is a wetland in Anguilla, a British Overseas Territory in the Caribbean Sea. It is one of the territory's Important Bird Areas (IBAs).

== Description ==
Road Salt Pond is a circular, 43 ha lagoon. It is the largest enclosed body of water on the island. It lies in the Sandy Ground district near the north-west coast of the main island. The dunes separating it from the sea at Road Bay on its western side have been flattened and built upon. It is bordered on the north and south by low hills supporting low dry forest and scrub as well as residential housing.

=== Birds ===
The IBA was identified as such by BirdLife International because it is a breeding site for least terns (with up to 123 birds recorded), as well as supporting populations of Caribbean elaenias, pearly-eyed thrashers and Lesser Antillean bullfinches.

== History ==
The pond has a long history of being used to produce salt, and the remains of saltworks infrastructure are visible around its edge. More recently, parts of the pond have been reclaimed for road construction and parking space.
