= Long Pond, Anguilla =

Lagoon of Anguilla

Coordinates: 18°12′45″N 63°01′11″W

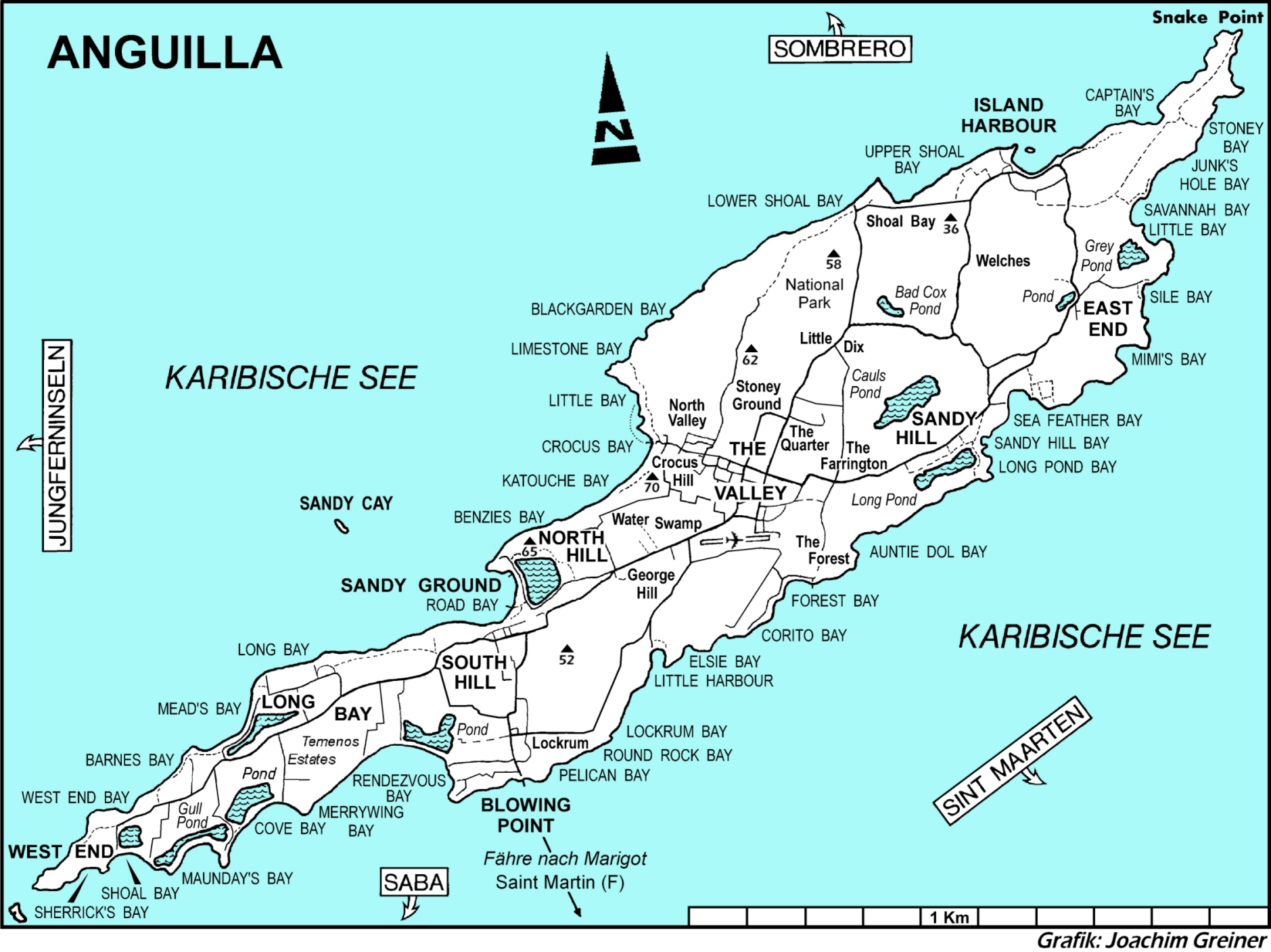
Map of Anguilla

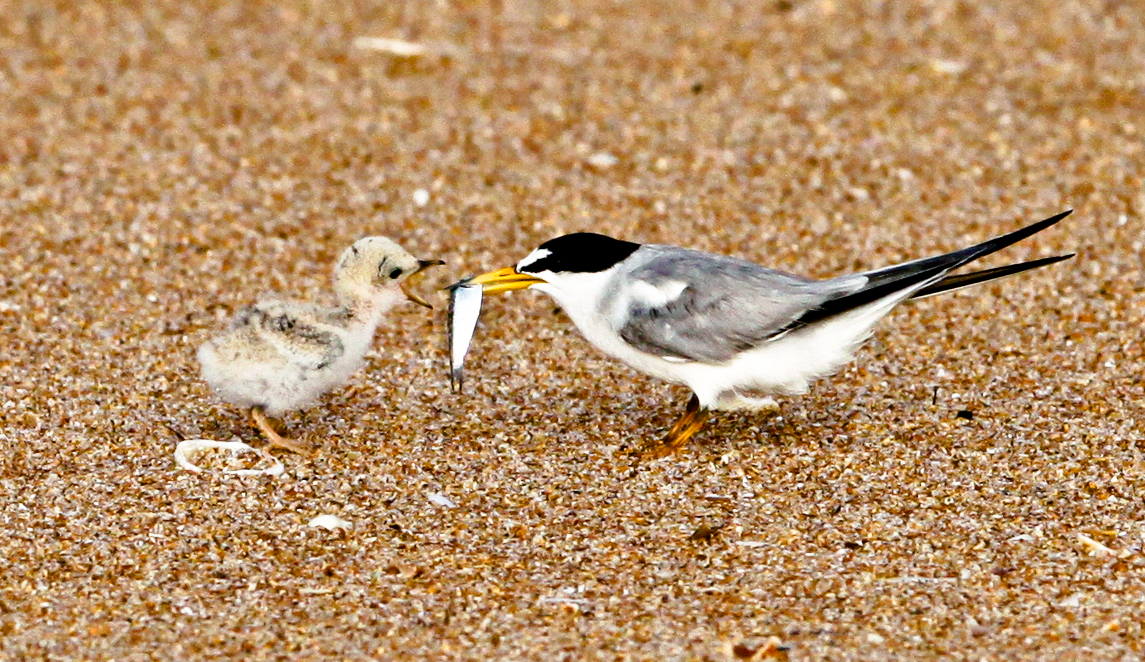
The lagoon is an important breeding site for least terns.

Long Pond, also known as Long Salt Pond, is a 23 hectare brackish lagoon on the central south-eastern coast of the main island of Anguilla, a British Overseas Territory in the Caribbean. About 1.2 km long, it is separated from the sea at its eastern end by sand dunes. Its south shore is separated from the sea by a 300 m wide strip of scrub vegetation on limestone. The area to the north and west is residential.

== Birds ==
The site has been identified as an Important Bird Area by BirdLife International mainly because, between April and September, it is an important nesting and roosting site for least terns, with about 130 breeding pairs recorded in 2007. It is a wintering site for common terns and visited regularly by snowy plovers. Land birds include restricted-range green-throated caribs and Caribbean elaenias.
