= North Hills =

North Hills may refer to:

== Places in the United States ==
- North Hills, Los Angeles, California
- North Hills, New York, a village in Nassau County
- North Hills (Raleigh), a mixed-use property in Raleigh, North Carolina
- North Hills, Pennsylvania, a community in Montgomery County
- North Hills (Pennsylvania), the collective name of the northern suburbs of Pittsburgh
- North Hills (SEPTA station), a train station in Montgomery County, Pennsylvania
- North Hills, West Virginia, a town in Wood County

== Music ==
- North Hills (album), by Dawes (2009)

== See also ==
- North Hill (disambiguation)
