= Wallblake House =

Plantation house and museum in Anguilla

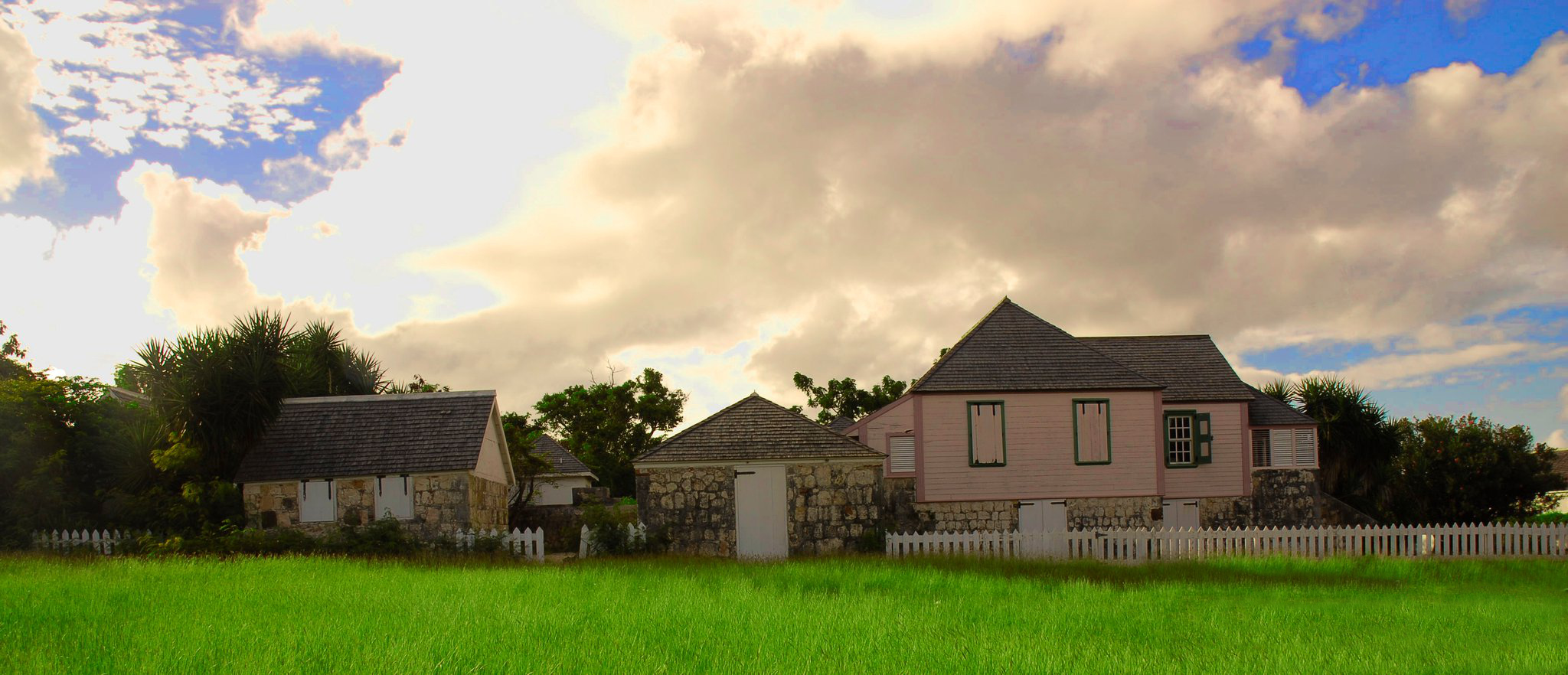

- Location within Anguilla Location within the Caribbean

General information
- Architectural style: Colonial architecture
- Location: The Valley, Anguilla
- Coordinates: 18.209444°N 63.054722°W
- Completed: 1787

Wallblake House is a heritage plantation house and museum annex in The Valley, Anguilla in the northeastern Caribbean. Built in 1787 by Will Blake, a sugar planter, it is stated to be the oldest structure on the island. Although gutted by the French in the late 1790s, it was rebuilt by the British and today has been fully restored, with its kitchen complex, stables and slave quarters intact. A church in the vicinity contains a stone fascia with open-air side walls and a ceiling, which is the form of a hull of a ship.

Wallblake House is one of the ten heritage houses in The Valley that was refurbished over a seven-year period and completed in 2004, at a cost of EC$250,000 (about US$92,000). The Wallblake Trust gained the support of the Catholic Church, many local enthusiasts and NGOS. The Heritage Trail Committee has raised the status of this house consequent to an agreement between the Wallblake Trust and the Anguilla Heritage Trail. It is Anguilla's only surviving plantation house.

== History ==
The house was built in the mid to late 1700s. The name "Wallblake" is probably a distortion of William Blake, a planter who lived around the end of the 18th century. The construction date, 1787, is noted from an inscription on an old brick on the northern kitchen wing. The first known historical event that occurred at the house was the French invasion by Victor Hugues of this island in 1796 when the Wallblake House witnessed a "crippled Anguillian" known as Hodge, taking shelter in its cellar. However, he could not escape the French soldiers who caught and executed him. This was followed by their gutting the property. The execution of the injured Anguillian further led to a reparation reflex reaction by the Anguillians as they executed the French prisoners of war who had been detained in the Old Court House on Crocus Hill, without trial. However, the French were not successful in their invasion effort as the local Angullians put up a brave fight and were supported by the British ship HMS Lapwing, arriving on the scene at the right time. After this incident, the Wallblake estate was rebuilt. The house was owned by the planter Valentine Blake for some time.

In the 1800s, when Anguilla experienced severe drought, the estate resorted to raising economic crops such as sugar and cotton over an area of 97 acres (39 ha) of plantation, but with little success, the same being true with the other Anguillian plantations. Thereafter, the estate saw several owners. In the 1900s, it was with Carter Rey, a rich business baron who had bought the estate from the Lake family. Next, it was owned by his younger brother Frank Rey. In 1959, Marie Rey Lake, who had converted from the Anglican Church to being a Roman Catholic, donated the house to the Catholic Church, which continues to own it till this day. The house was leased to the Department of Tourism in 1978 for a time when they refurbished it. After the lease expired, the house was returned to the Roman Catholic Church and currently functions as a rectory.

Now the heritage monument is being planned to depict the history of the island and the Anguilla's Heritage Trail. In this effort, Lilli Azevedo, an archaeologist and Heritage Trail Committee member who is providing the narration support, has planned to give expositions of the archaeological findings of Fountain Cavern related to the Amerindian archaeology of Anguilla.

== Architecture and features ==
The house has a stone foundation. The roof is formed with Guyanese hardwood and is shingled. The upper section is wooden. The original structure was built with dressed stones that were probably brought from East End or even Scrub Island. The lime mortar for jointing was made from a mixture of burnt coral and shells with admixtures of molasses and marl. The original timber has been retained in the upper floors. The structure has double paneling. Intricate carvings on its edges give the effect of a "tray ceiling", that is, the appearance of inverted trays hung from the roof as if rope is tied to the edges to hide any defects in its construction.

The heritage building has been restored to its original design and colour scheme. The elegant and decorative designs that existed in the original building have been fully retained.

== Grounds ==
The grounds have a bakery, cistern, and stable block. Tall Spanish bayonet trees are on the property. An adjacent church has a unique decorative stone front facade.

== Tourism ==
Set behind a white picket fence, Wallblake is now a private house, and living quarters of the priest from St Gerard's Roman Catholic Church. However, tours can be arranged. It also serves as a museum annex, as well as a venue for art shows, flower shops and marriage receptions. The international airport in The Valley, just to the south of the house, was named Wallblake Airport, and has now been renamed Clayton J. Lloyd International Airport.
