= Forest Bay Pond =

Wetland in Anguilĺa, Caribbean Sea

Coordinates: 18°11′27″N 63°03′33″W

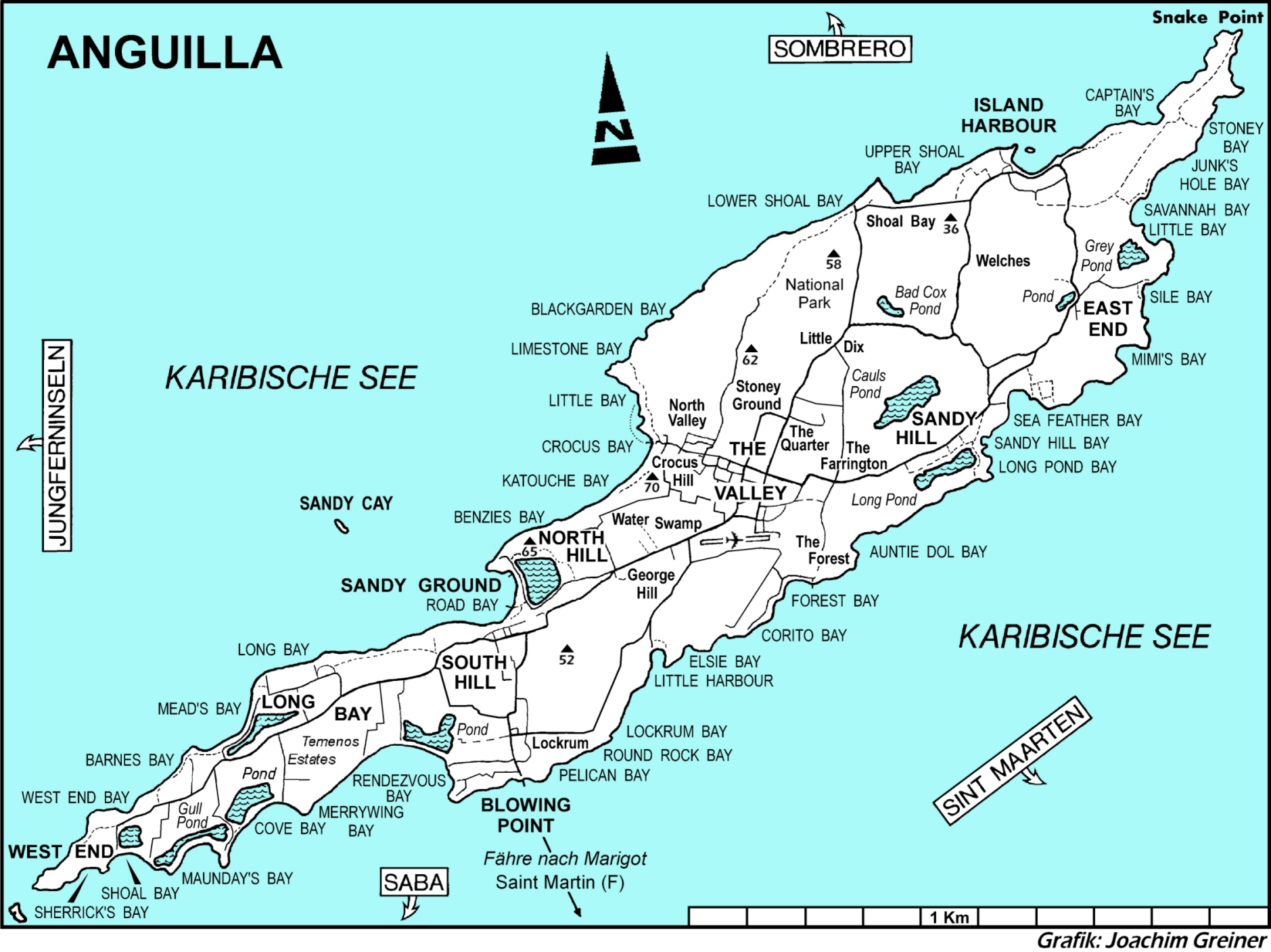
Map of Anguilla showing Forest Bay midway along the south-eastern coast of the island

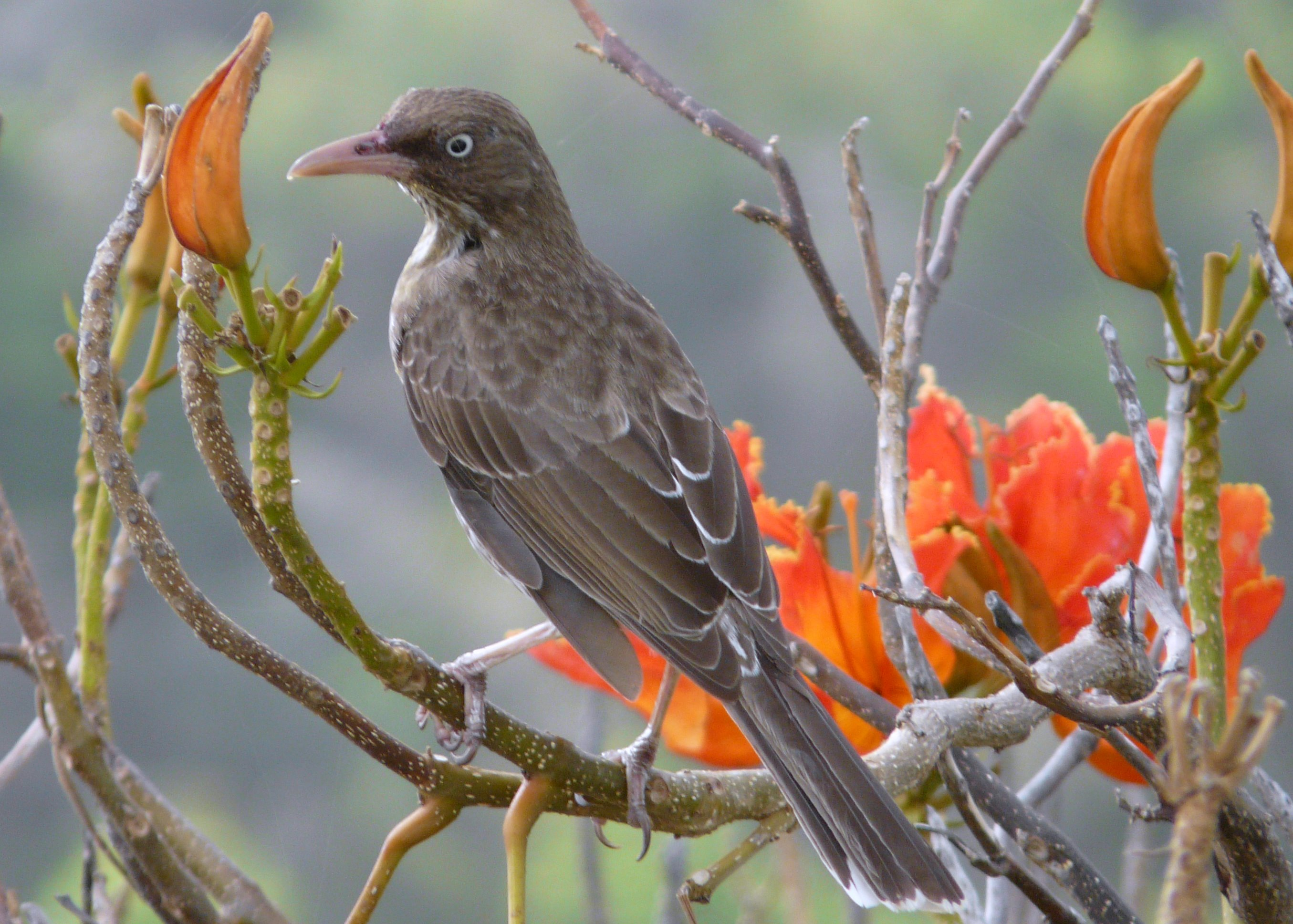
The IBA is an important site for pearly-eyed thrashers

Forest Bay Pond is a small wetland in Anguilla, a British Overseas Territory in the Caribbean Sea. It forms one of the territory's Important Bird Areas (IBAs).

== Description ==
The IBA comprises a small brackish lagoon and its associated vegetation, with an area of about 3 hectares (7.4 acres), on the mid south-eastern coast of the main island, next to Forest Bay. It receives water from rainfall runoff as well as seawater seepage from the bay. It consists of two basins that are separated by a mudflat when the water level is low. The western and southern side has a substrate of limestone; that of the eastern is sand and marl. The pond contains widgeongrass while its surrounds are vegetated with white and buttonwood mangroves, as well as sea grape and other shrubs.

=== Birds ===
The IBA was identified as such by BirdLife International because it supports populations of green-throated caribs, Caribbean elaenias, pearly-eyed thrashers and Lesser Antillean bullfinches.
