= Merrywing Pond System =

Golf course wetland system in Anguilla

Coordinates: 18°10′36″N 63°07′36″W

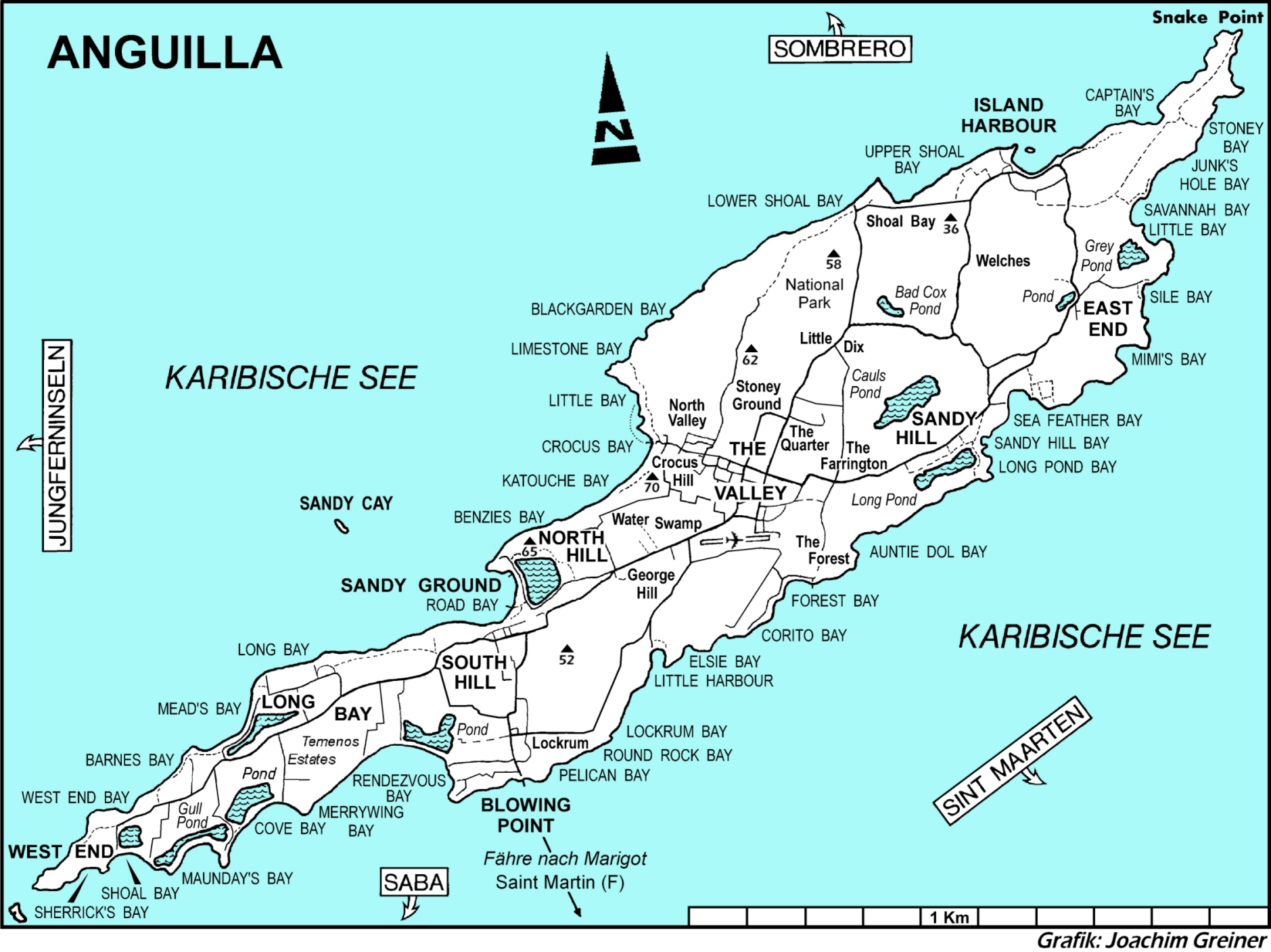
Map of Anguilla showing Merrywing and Rendezvous Bays near the south-western end of the island

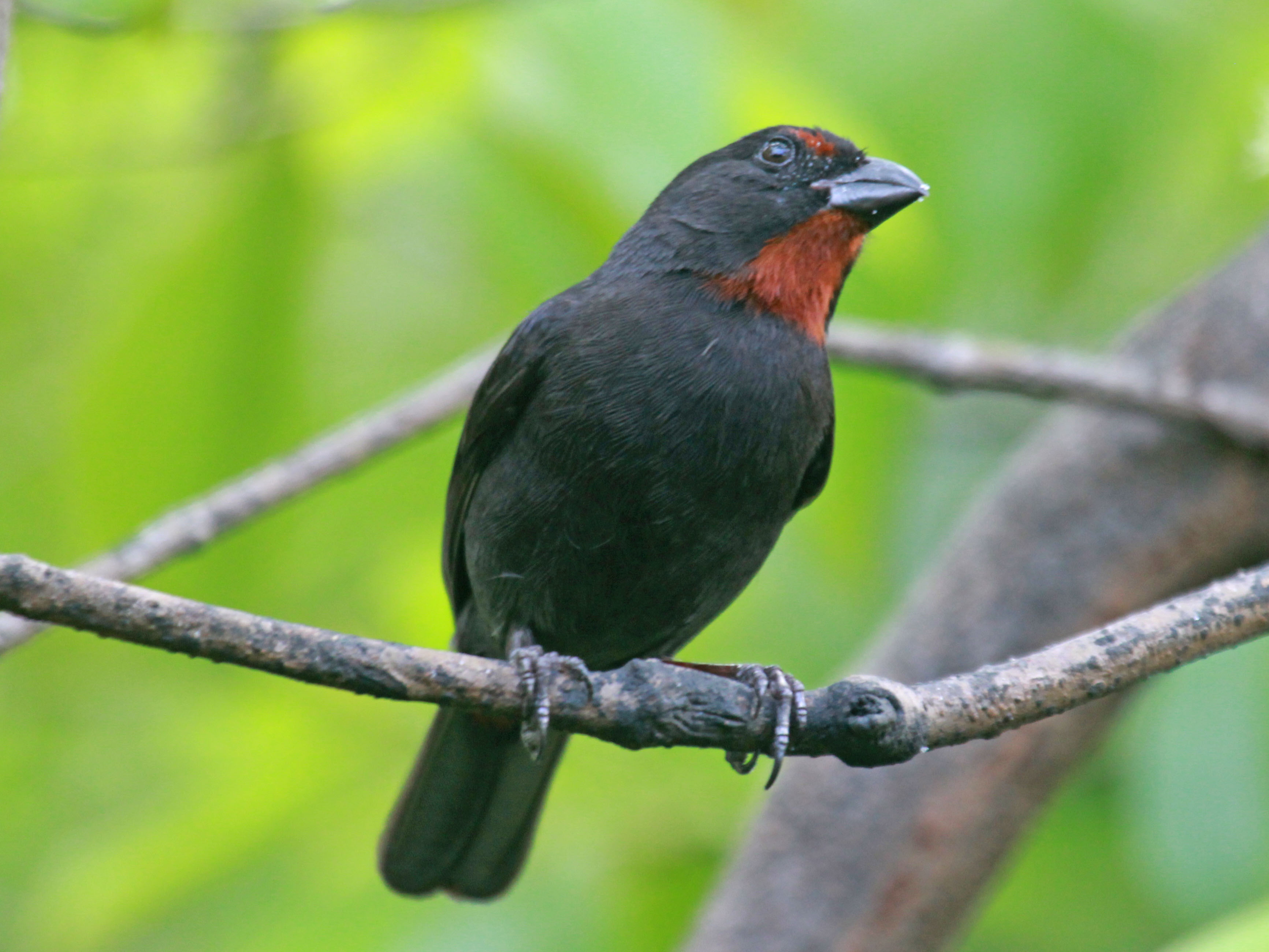
The IBA is an important site for Lesser Antillean bullfinches

The Merrywing Pond System is a golf course wetland system in Anguilla, a British Overseas Territory in the Caribbean Sea. It forms one of the territory's Important Bird Areas (IBAs).

== Description ==
The IBA comprises five small ponds and their associated vegetation, with a total area of about 9 ha, on the Cuisinart Golf Course, near the south-western end of the main island, next to Rendezvous and Merrywing Bays. Two of the ponds are artificial, and are used as freshwater reservoirs for irrigation; the other three are natural and brackish, receiving both freshwater runoff from rainfall and seawater seepage from the bays. The site is vegetated with a mix of native and exotic ornamental plants.

=== Birds ===
The IBA was identified as such by BirdLife International because it supports populations of green-throated caribs, Caribbean elaenias and Lesser Antillean bullfinches.
