= Leeward Islands =

Subgroup of islands in the West Indies

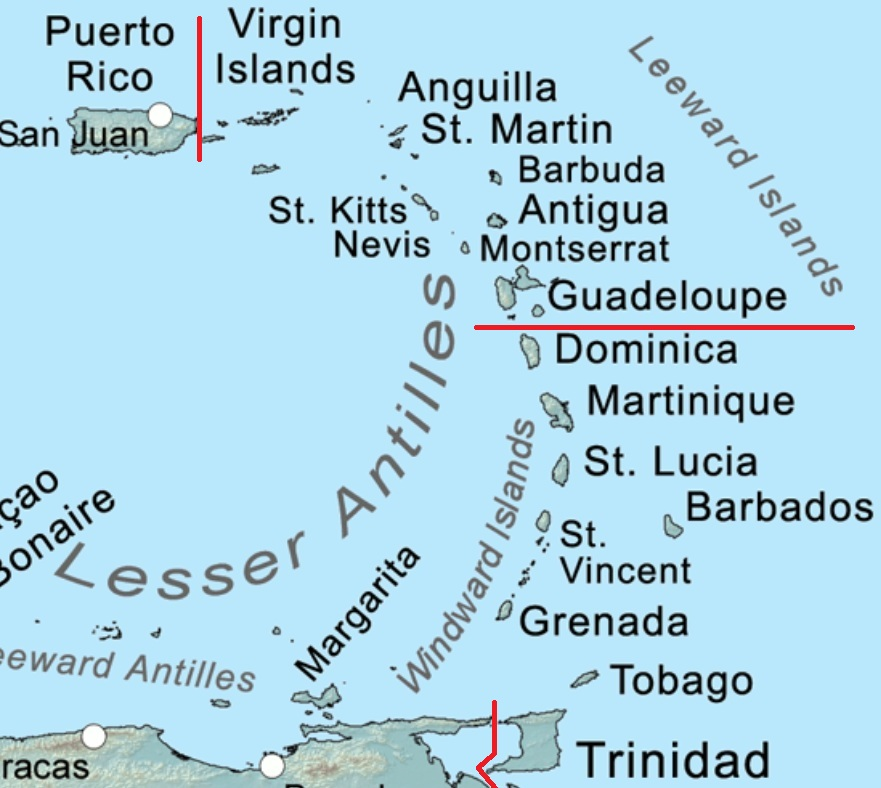
- Location of Leeward Islands within Caribbean (dark green shading) Map of the Leeward Islands from the Virgin Islands to Guadeloupe in the Caribbean
- Interactive map of Leeward Islands

Geography
- Coordinates: 16°N 61°W
- Adjacent to: Caribbean Sea; North Atlantic Ocean
- Total islands: 30+
- Major islands: Antigua; Barbuda; Guadeloupe; Montserrat; Nevis; Saint Kitts; Saint Martin; Virgin Islands
- Area: 3,167.6 km^{2} (1,223.0 sq mi)
- Highest elevation: 1,467 m (4813 ft)
- Highest point: La Grande Soufrière, Guadeloupe

Administration
- Antigua and Barbuda
- Largest settlement: St. John's
- British Virgin Islands
- Largest settlement: Road Town
- Guadeloupe
- Largest settlement: Les Abymes
- Puerto Rico
- Archipelago: Spanish Virgin Islands
- Largest settlement: Vieques
- St. Kitts and Nevis
- Largest settlement: Basseterre
- Sint Maarten
- Largest settlement: Philipsburg
- U.S. Virgin Islands
- Largest settlement: Charlotte Amalie

Demographics
- Population: c. +700,000
- Languages: English, Spanish, French, Dutch; English-based creoles Antillean Creole
- Ethnic groups: Caribbean people (Afro-Caribbean, White, Indo-Caribbean, Chinese)

Additional information
- Time zone: Atlantic Time Zone (UTC–4)

The Leeward Islands (/ˈliːwərd/) are a group of islands in the Lesser Antilles of the West Indies in the Caribbean region of the Americas, situated where the northeastern Caribbean Sea meets the western North Atlantic Ocean. Starting with the Virgin Islands east of the Greater Antilles main island of Puerto Rico, they extend southeast to Guadeloupe and its dependencies. They lie north of the Windward Islands, southern islands from Dominica to Trinidad and Tobago, and northeast of the Leeward Antilles, southwestern islands from the Federal Dependencies of Venezuela to Aruba.

In English, the term Leeward Islands refers to the northern islands of the Lesser Antilles chain. The more southerly part of this chain, from Dominica to Trinidad and Tobago, is known as the Windward Islands. Dominica was initially considered a part of the Leeward Islands, but was transferred from the British Leeward Islands to the British Windward Islands in 1940.

== Origin of the name ==
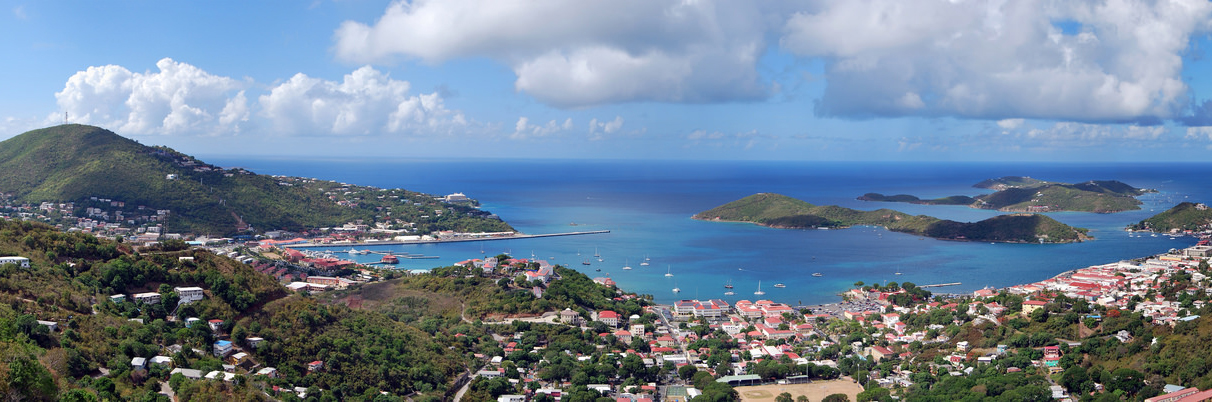
Charlotte Amalie, Saint Thomas, in the U.S. Virgin Islands

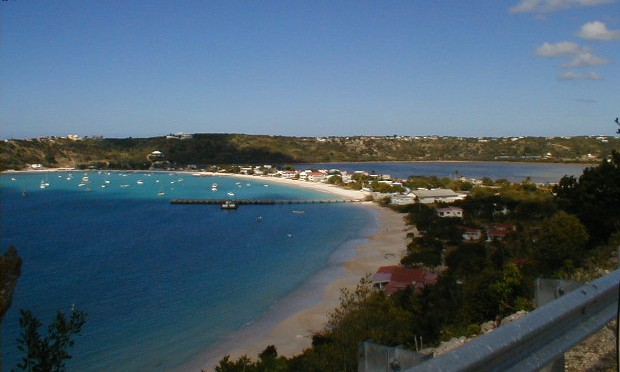
Overlooking Sandy Ground, Anguilla

The name of this island group, Leeward Islands, dates from previous centuries, when sailing ships were the sole form of transportation across the Atlantic Ocean. In sailing terminology, "windward" means towards the source of the wind (upwind), while "leeward" is the opposite direction (downwind). In the West Indies, the prevailing winds, known as the trade winds, blow predominantly out of the southeast. Therefore, a sailing vessel departing from the British Gold Coast and the Gulf of Guinea, driven by the trade winds, would usually first encounter Dominica and Martinique, islands most to windward, in their west-northwesterly heading to the final destinations in the Caribbean, Central America, and Northern America. This location, Dominica and Martinique, becomes the rough dividing line between the Windward Islands and the Leeward Islands.

The early Spanish explorers called Puerto Rico and the islands to the west Sotavento, meaning "leeward". The islands south and east of Puerto Rico were called Islas de Barlovento, meaning "windward islands". When the British gained control of many of the Lesser Antilles, they designated Antigua, Montserrat, and the islands to the north as the Leeward Islands. Guadeloupe and the islands to the south were designated as the Windward Islands. Later on, all islands north of Martinique became known as the Leeward Islands. Dominica was transferred to the British Windward Islands in 1940 and is now considered part of the Windward Islands.

However, even in modern usage in languages other than English, notably Dutch, French, and Spanish, all of the Lesser Antilles from the Virgin Islands to Trinidad and Tobago are known as the Windward Islands (Bovenwindse Eilanden in Dutch, Îles du Vent in French, and Islas de Barlovento in Spanish). The ABC islands and the other islands along the Venezuelan coast, known in English as the Leeward Antilles, are known in languages other than English as an equivalent of the Leeward Islands.

== Geography ==
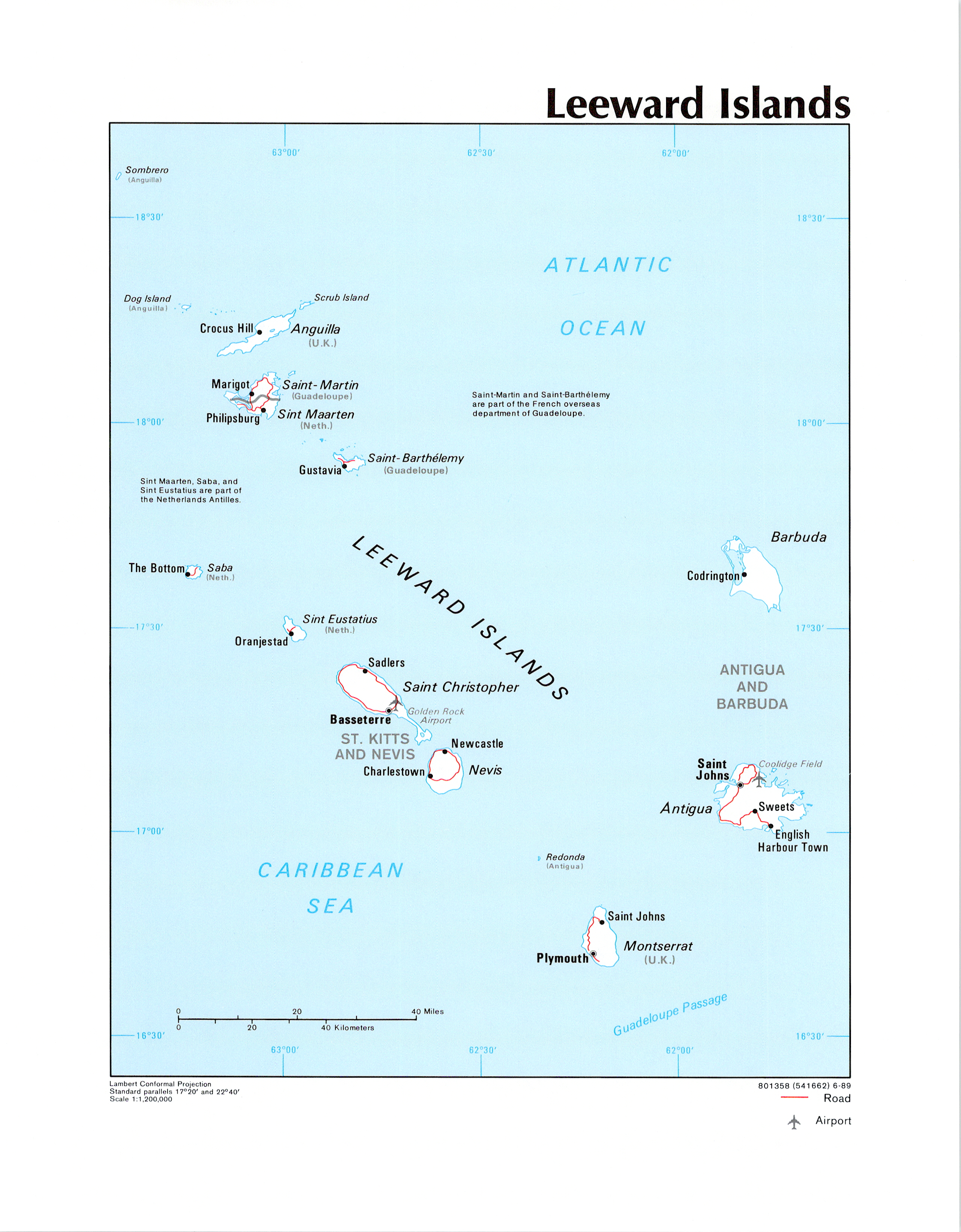
Map of the central Leeward Islands

The islands were created mostly by volcanoes in the Lesser Antilles subduction zone. Some are still active. Notable eruptions occurred in Montserrat in the 1990s and in 2009 to 2010. At 1,467 metres or 4,813 feet, the highest point is La Grande Soufrière in Guadeloupe.

== History ==
The Caribs, after whom the Caribbean is named, are believed to have migrated from the Orinoco River area in Venezuela in South America to settle in the Caribbean islands about 1200 AD, according to carbon dating. Over the century leading up to Columbus' arrival in the Caribbean archipelago in 1492, the Caribs mostly displaced the Maipurean-speaking Taínos, who settled the island chains earlier in history, by warfare, extermination, and assimilation.

The islands were among the first parts of the Americas to fall under the control of the Spanish Empire. European contact commenced with Christopher Columbus's second voyage; many of the islands' names originate from this period: Montserrat was named in honour of Santa Maria de Montserrat (Our Lady of Montserrat), after the Blessed Virgin of the Monastery of Montserrat, which is located on the Mountain of Montserrat, the national shrine of Catalonia. Mont serrat in Catalan means "saw mountain", referring to the serrated appearance of the mountain range.

=== British colony of the Leeward Islands ===
The Leeward Islands became a British colony in 1671, with William Stapleton as its first governor.

Although comparatively much smaller than the surrounding islands in the Caribbean, the Leeward Islands posed the most significant rebellion to the British Stamp Act, though it was decidedly less severe in comparison to that of the mainland North American colonies.

In 1660, there were about 8,000 white settlers and approximately 2,000 enslaved Africans in the Leeward Islands. However, that ratio narrowed over succeeding years. In 1678, there were 10,408 white settlers and 8,449 enslaved Black people. By 1708, there was a huge disparity between the number of white settlers, which had declined to 7,311, and the number of enslaved Black people was estimated at 23,500.

In 1816, the colony was dissolved as a federation of islands, and the individual islands were ruled individually. However, the colony of the Leeward Islands was re-established in 1833.

== List of notable islands in the Leeward Islands ==
There are two countries and eleven territories in the Leeward Islands. From the northwest to the southeast, the main islands are:

- Virgin Islands
  - Spanish Virgin Islands
    - Spanish (Puerto Rican) Islands (Puerto Rico) (United States)
    - Culebra (Municipality of Puerto Rico) (United States)
    - Vieques (Municipality of Puerto Rico) (United States)
  - U.S. Virgin Islands (United States)
    - St. Thomas
    - St. John
    - St. Croix
    - Water Island
  - British Virgin Islands (British Overseas Territory)
    - Jost Van Dyke
    - Tortola
    - Virgin Gorda
    - Anegada
- Anguilla (British Overseas Territory)
- St. Martin Island
  - St. Martin (France)
  - Sint Maarten (Netherlands)
- Saint Barthélemy (France)
- Saba (Netherlands)
- Sint Eustatius (Netherlands)
- Saint Kitts and Nevis
  - Saint Kitts
  - Nevis
- Antigua and Barbuda
  - Barbuda
  - Antigua
  - Redonda — uninhabited
- Montserrat (British Overseas Territory)
- Guadeloupe (France)
  - La Désirade (dependency of Guadeloupe) — literally 'The Desired', also called La Deseada
  - Îles des Saintes (dependency of Guadeloupe)
  - Marie-Galante (dependency of Guadeloupe)

== See also ==
- Leeward Islands moist forests
- British Leeward Islands
- Leeward Antilles
- Leeward Islands Cricket Association
- Leeward Islands cricket team
- Lesser Antilles
- Lesser Antilles topics
  - Leeward Islands topics
  - Windward Islands topics
- Windward Islands
