= West End Pond =

Wetland in Anguilla

Coordinates: 18°16′05″N 63°16′28″W

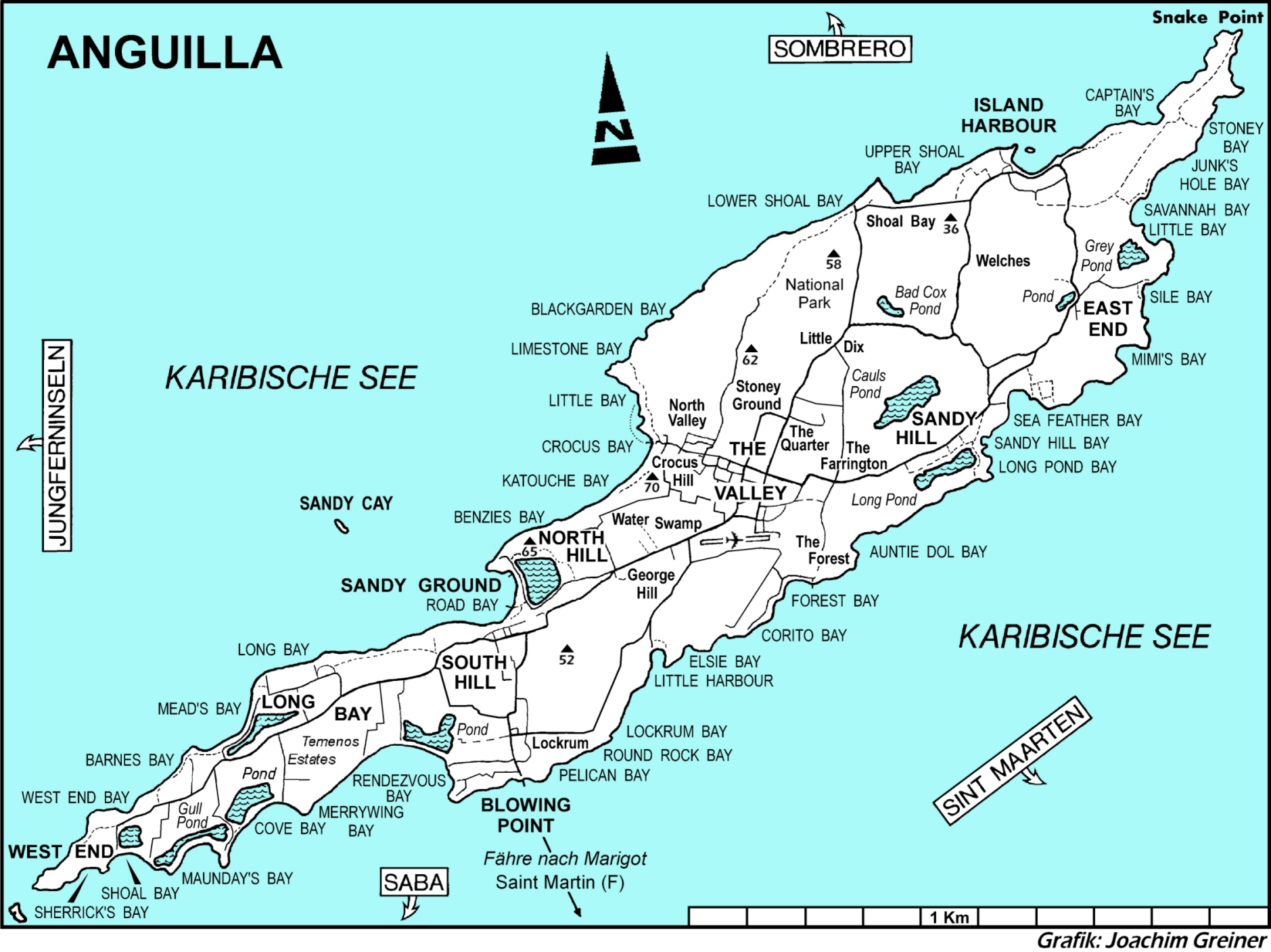
Map of Anguilla showing the pond near the south-western end of the island

West End Pond is a wetland in Anguilla, a British Overseas Territory in the Caribbean Sea. It is one of the territory's Important Bird Areas (IBAs).

== Description ==
The pond is a 19 ha ( 47 acres ) brackish lagoon in the West End district, near the south-western end of the main island, and was historically used for salt production. It has a marl substrate and rocky shoreline and is divided by a culverted causeway that provides access to tourism development along the beach at Shoal Bay West. The eastern basin of the pond is roughly circular and about 370 m 1214 ft across, while the western section is longer and narrower. It is mostly surrounded by stands of black, white and buttonwood mangroves.

=== Birds ===
The IBA was identified as such by BirdLife International because it supports populations of royal and common terns, Caribbean elaenias and Lesser Antillean bullfinches.
