= North Hill Historic District =

North Hill Historic District may refer to:

- North Hill Historic District (Mingo Junction, Ohio), listed on the National Register of Historic Places (NRHP) in Jefferson County, Ohio
- North Hill Historic District (New Castle, Pennsylvania), listed on the NRHP

== See also ==
- North Hill Preservation District, Pensacola, Florida, listed on the NRHP
