= The Farrington =

- District
- Location within Anguilla
- Coordinates: 18.21280°N 63.03002°W
- Country: United Kingdom
- Overseas Territory: Anguilla

Area
  - Land: 1.74 sq mi (4.50 km^{2})

Population (2011)
  - Total: 624
  - Density: 359/sq mi (139/km^{2})

The Farrington is one of the fourteen districts of Anguilla. Its population at the 2011 census was 624.

== Demographics ==
Historical population

Year	Pop.	±%
1984	222	—
1994	304	+36.9%

Year	Pop.	±%
2001	546	+79.6%
2011	624	+14.3%

Source: Statoids.com
