= The Valley, Anguilla =

Capital of Anguilla

The Valley
- Capital city
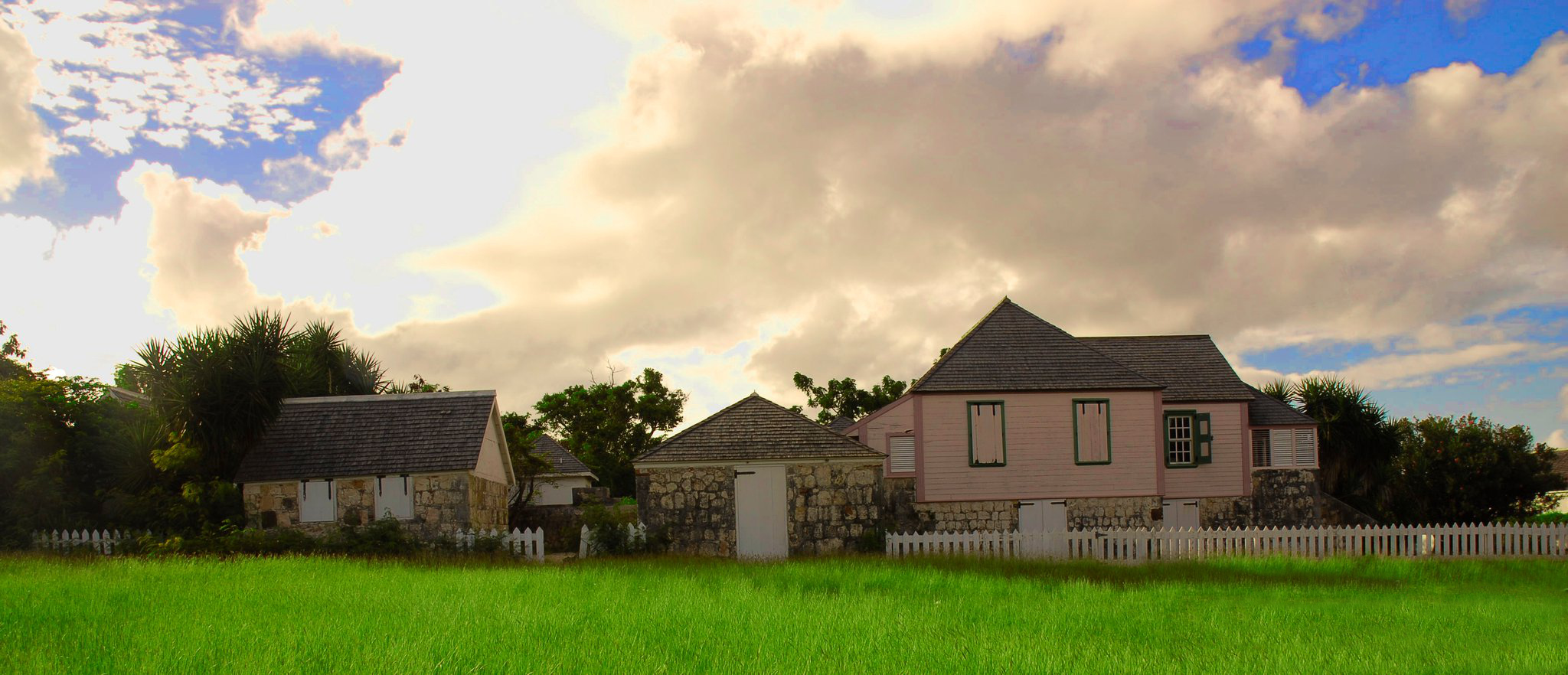
- Wallblake House

- Location within Anguilla Location within North America
- Coordinates: 18°13′15″N 63°03′06″W
- Country: United Kingdom
- Overseas Territory: Anguilla

Area
  - Land: 1.05 sq mi (2.72 km^{2})
- Elevation: 30 ft (9 m)

Population (2020)
  - Total: 3,269
- Time zone: UTC– 04:00 (AST)

The Valley is the capital of Anguilla, one of its fourteen districts, and the main town on the island. As of 2011, it had a population of 3,269.

== History ==
=== Historical landmarks ===
The Valley has few examples of colonial architecture due to the relocation of Anguilla's administration to St. Kitts in 1825, though Wallblake House, built in 1787, still stands and is used as a rectory by the adjacent church. New shops have opened in new buildings and renovated West Indian-style cottages. Old shops have been modernised and have enlarged their stocks as well as their space.

The ruins of the Old Court House are located on Crocus Hill, the island's highest point. All that remains are the broken walls of a few basement jail cells. At Cross Roads at the western edge of The Valley is Wallblake House, a plantation home built around 1787 that is now owned by the Catholic Church (the parish priest lives there) and St. Gerard's Catholic Church, with its highly original façade of pebbles, stones, cement, wood and tile.

== Geography ==
=== Location ===
The town is located in the middle of the island, in front of Crocus Bay and nearby Crocus Hill, the island's highest point. Nearest villages are North Side, The Quarter, North Hill and George Hill.

=== Climate ===
The Valley has a tropical wet and dry climate (Aw) under the Köppen climate classification. The area has a short dry season that covers the months of February and March, and a wet season that covers the remainder of the year. However the wet season, though lengthy, does not quite see the heavy precipitation that is commonplace in other Caribbean cities such as Santo Domingo and San Juan. Average temperatures in The Valley are relatively constant throughout the year, ranging from 26–29 degrees Celsius.

Climate data for The Valley
Month	Jan	Feb	Mar	Apr	May	Jun	Jul	Aug	Sep	Oct	Nov	Dec	Year
Mean daily maximum °C (°F)	25.6 (78.1)	25.3 (77.5)	25.3 (77.5)	25.9 (78.6)	26.7 (80.1)	27.5 (81.5)	27.8 (82.0)	28.2 (82.8)	28.2 (82.8)	27.9 (82.2)	27.2 (81.0)	26.3 (79.3)	26.8 (80.3)
Daily mean °C (°F)	25.1 (77.2)	24.8 (76.6)	24.8 (76.6)	25.3 (77.5)	26.2 (79.2)	27.0 (80.6)	27.2 (81.0)	27.5 (81.5)	27.6 (81.7)	27.3 (81.1)	26.6 (79.9)	25.8 (78.4)	26.3 (79.3)
Mean daily minimum °C (°F)	24.4 (75.9)	24.1 (75.4)	24.2 (75.6)	24.6 (76.3)	25.5 (77.9)	26.3 (79.3)	26.4 (79.5)	26.6 (79.9)	26.7 (80.1)	26.4 (79.5)	25.8 (78.4)	25.0 (77.0)	25.5 (77.9)
Average precipitation mm (inches)	24.4 (0.96)	20.8 (0.82)	18.6 (0.73)	22.5 (0.89)	39.2 (1.54)	41.3 (1.63)	72.8 (2.87)	83.1 (3.27)	81.1 (3.19)	82.2 (3.24)	64.8 (2.55)	34.2 (1.35)	585 (23.04)
Source: Weather.Directory

== Demography ==
Historical population
Year	Pop.	±%
1974	1,048	—
1984	1,709	+63.1%
1994	795	−53.5%
2001	1,169	+47.0%
2011	1,067	−8.7%
Source: Statoids.com

== Transport ==
The Valley is served by Clayton J. Lloyd International Airport (IATA: AXA, ICAO: TQPF) with some international flights.

== Education ==
There are two government schools, Valley Primary School and Albena Lake-Hodge Comprehensive School (secondary).

Omololu International School, a primary and lower secondary private school, is in The Valley. It was Anguilla's first private school, and opened in 1994 as the Teacher Gloria Omololu Institute. It adopted its current name on 1 April 2013. It uses the International Baccalaureate (IB) curriculum. The name "Omululu" means "Child of God" in the Yoruba language.

== Notable people ==
- Cardigan Connor (born 1961), cricketer
- Carlos Newton (born 1976), mixed martial artist
- Omari Banks (born 1982), musician and cricketer
- Zharnel Hughes (born 1995), sprinter
- Dee-Ann Kentish-Rogers (born 1993), politician and former model

== See also ==
- Ronald Webster Park
- St. Gerard Church, The Valley
