= The Quarter, Anguilla =

The Quarter
- District
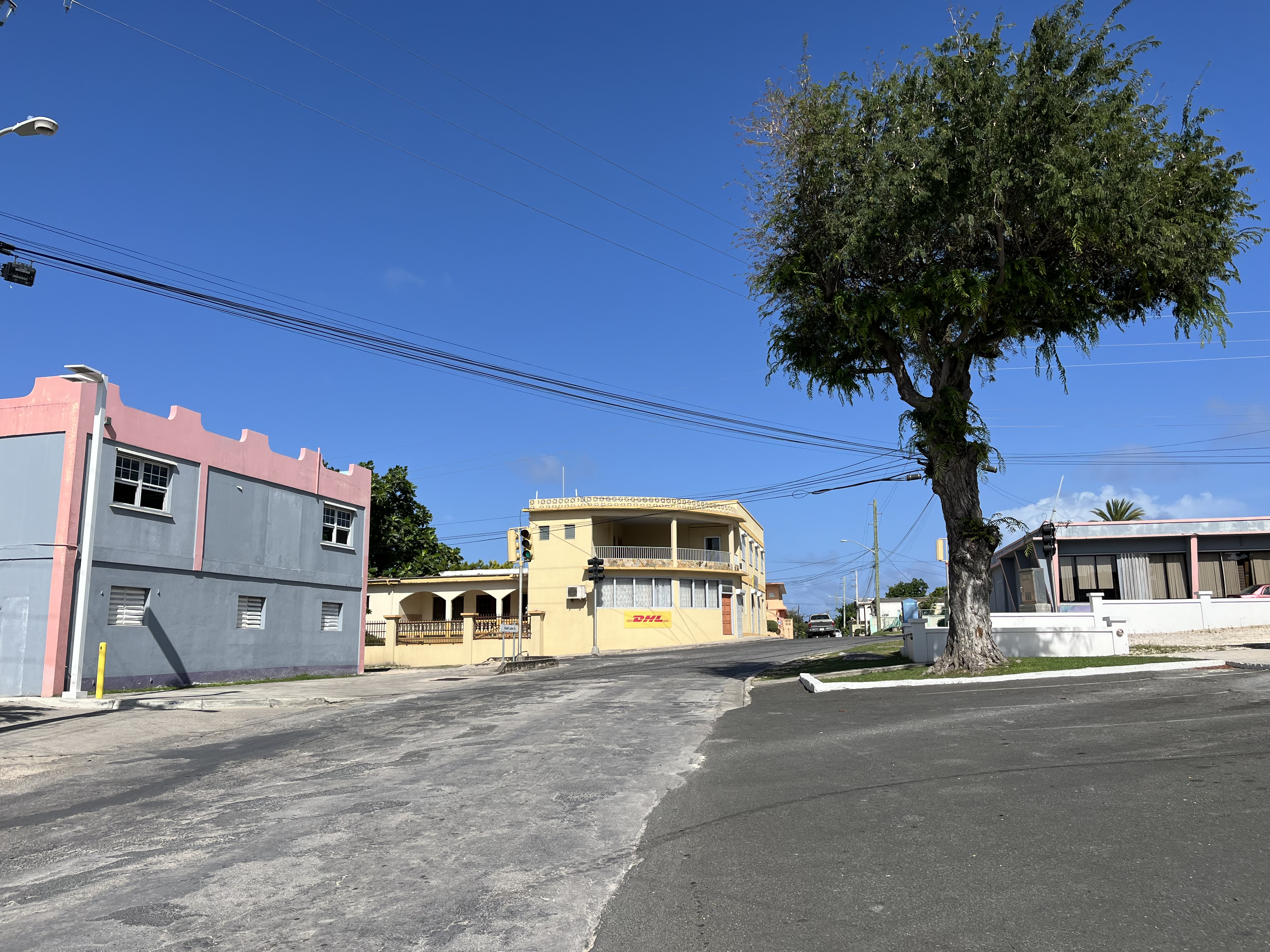

- Location within Anguilla
- Coordinates: 18.21256°N 63.05054°W
- Country: United Kingdom
- Overseas Territory: Anguilla

Area
  - Land: 1.22 sq mi (3.17 km^{2})

Population (2011)
  - Total: 959

The Quarter is one of the fourteen Districts of Anguilla. Its population at the 2011 census was 959.

== Demographics ==
Historical population

Year	Pop.	±%
1974	742	—
1984	424	−42.9%
1994	654	+54.2%

Year	Pop.	±%
2001	978	+49.5%
2011	959	−1.9%

Source: Statoids.com
