= Sandy Hill, Anguilla =

Sandy Hill
- District
- Location within Anguilla
- Coordinates: 18.22218°N 63.01346°W
- Country: United Kingdom
- Overseas Territory: Anguilla

Area
  - Land: 2.55 sq mi (6.61 km^{2})

Population (2011)
  - Total: 636

Sandy Hill is one of the fourteen Districts of Anguilla. Its population at the 2011 census was 636.

== Demographics ==
Historical population

Year	Pop.	±%
1974	314	—
1984	376	+19.7%
1994	364	−3.2%

Year	Pop.	±%
2001	557	+53.0%
2011	636	+14.2%

Source: Statoids.com

== Politics ==
The incumbent is Jerome Roberts of the Anguilla Progressive Party.
