= East End, Anguilla =

East End
- District
- Location within Anguilla
- Coordinates: 18.23441°N 62.99458°W
- Country: United Kingdom
- Overseas Territory: Anguilla

Area
  - Land: 1.92 sq mi (4.98 km^{2})

Population (2011)
  - Total: 671

East End is one of the fourteen Districts of Anguilla. Its population at the 2011 census was 671.

== Education ==
There is one government school in the town, Morris Vanterpool Primary School. Albena Lake-Hodge Comprehensive School in The Valley serves secondary students.

== Demographics ==
Historical population

Year	Pop.	±%
1974	476	—
1984	420	−11.8%
1994	672	+60.0%

Year	Pop.	±%
2001	614	−8.6%
2011	671	+9.3%

Source: Statoids.com
