= North Side, Anguilla =

North Side
- District
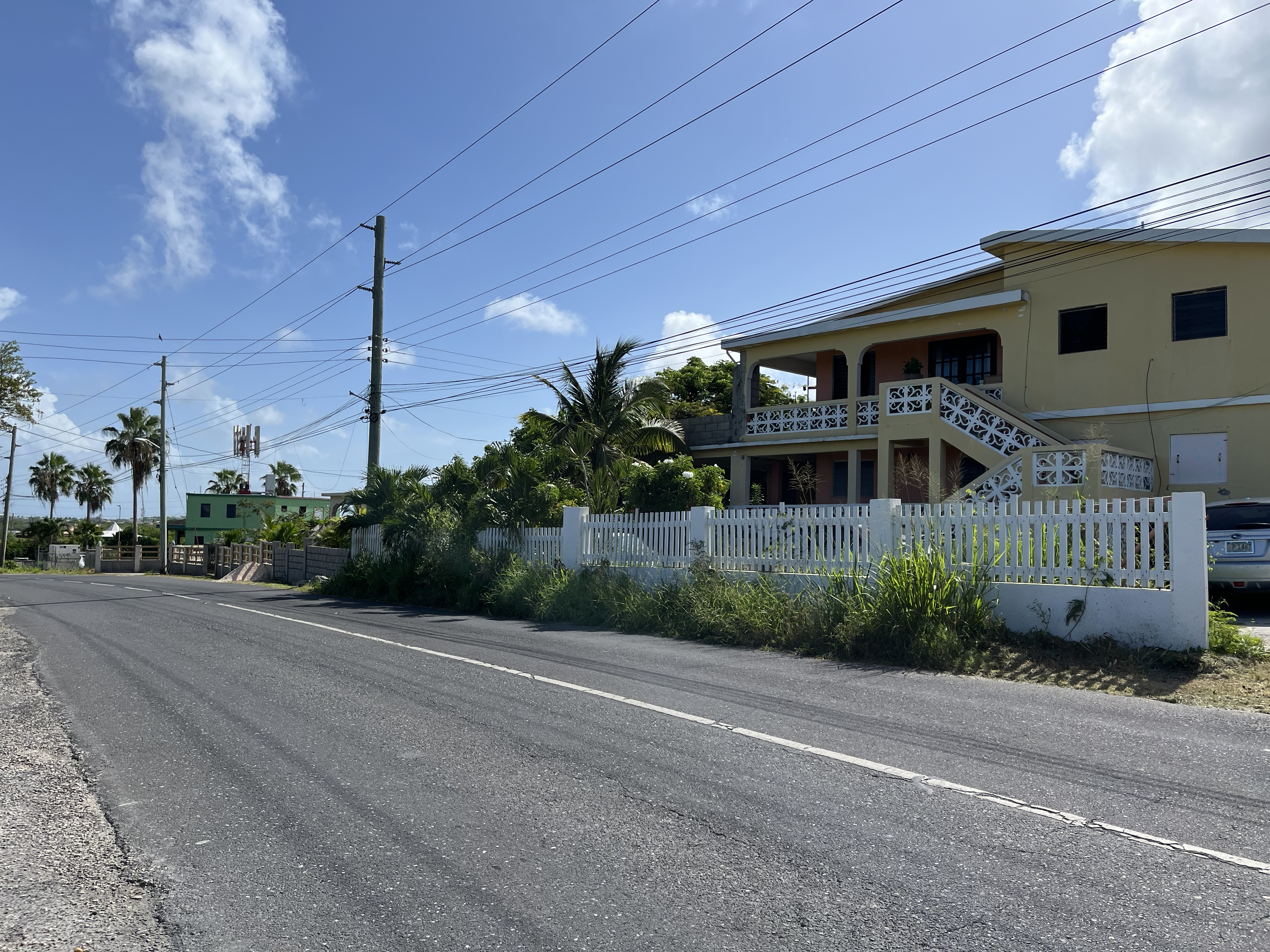

- Location within Anguilla
- Coordinates: 18.23033°N 63.04333°W
- Country: United Kingdom
- Overseas Territory: Anguilla

Area
  - Land: 3.47 sq mi (8.99 km^{2})

Population (2011)
  - Total: 1,980

North Side is one of the fourteen districts of Anguilla, a British Overseas Territory in the Caribbean. It covers both coastal and inland areas on the northeastern coast of the main island. According to the 2011 census, North Side had 1,980 residents. The district features rocky terrain with sandy beaches, and dense vegetation towards the interior.

== Geography ==
North Side is one of the fourteen districts of Anguilla, a British Overseas Territory in the Caribbean. It is located along Anguilla’s northeastern coastline, and is lined with sandy beaches and rocky cliffs with dense vegetation in the interior. The district supports a variety of wildlife including seabirds and songbirds.

== Demographics ==
Historical population
Year	Pop.	±%
1994	667	—
2001	1,195	+79.2%
2011	1,577	+32.0%

North Side is the most populated district in Anguilla. It had population of 1,980 individuals in 2011, a significant increase from the population of 1,195 recorded in 2011. The population lives in closely knit communities in small villages with limited infrastructure and the culture steeped in Anguillan traditions. The economy is tourism-driven with fishing and small-scale agriculture also pervalent. Small eateries and food stalls sell traditional dishes, mostly based on freshly caught seafood.
