= Crocus Hill =

Mountain in Anguilla' United Kingdom

- Location within Anguilla

Highest point
- Elevation: 73 m (240 ft)
- Prominence: 73 m (240 ft)
- Listing: Country high point
- Coordinates: 18°12′43″N 63°04′14″W

Geography
- Location: Near The Valley, Anguilla

Crocus Hill is the highest point of Anguilla, a British overseas territory in the Caribbean, with an elevation of 73 metres (240 ft). The hill is located near The Valley, Anguilla's capital. Crocus Bay (west of the hill) was named after Crocus Hill.

== See also ==
- Geography of Anguilla
