= Sandy Ground, Anguilla =

Sandy Ground
- District
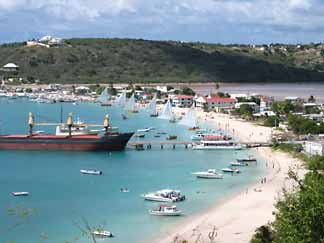

- Location within Anguilla
- Coordinates: 18°12′0″N 63°5′0″W
- Country: United Kingdom
- Overseas Territory: Anguilla

Area
  - Land: 1.14 km^{2} (0.44 sq mi)

Population (2011)
  - Total: 230

Sandy Ground is a village and one of the fourteen Districts of Anguilla, and its main port. The long curved beach is backed by high cliffs and a disused salt pond. According to the 2011 census Sandy Ground has a population of 230.

== Population ==
Historical population

Year	Pop.	±%
1974	242	—
1984	234	−3.3%
1994	247	+5.6%

Year	Pop.	±%
2001	274	+10.9%
2011	230	−16.1%

Source: Statoids.com

== History ==
On 19 March 1969, during Operation Sheepskin, British troops from 2 PARA that were deployed from HMS Rothesay landed on the nearby beach and occupied the village as part of the operation.
