= North Hill, Anguilla =

North Hill
- District
- Location within Anguilla
- Coordinates: 18.20881°N 63.07560°W
- Country: United Kingdom
- Overseas Territory: Anguilla

Area
  - Land: 0.51 sq mi (1.31 km^{2})

Population (2011)
  - Total: 464

North Hill is one of the fourteen Districts of Anguilla. Its population at the 2011 census was 464.

== Demographics ==
Historical population

Year	Pop.	±%
1974	313	—
1984	288	−8.0%
1994	410	+42.4%

Year	Pop.	±%
2001	439	+7.1%
2011	464	+5.7%

Source: Statoids.com
