= North Hill Preservation District =

Historic district in Florida, United States

- U.S. National Register of Historic Places
- U.S. Historic district
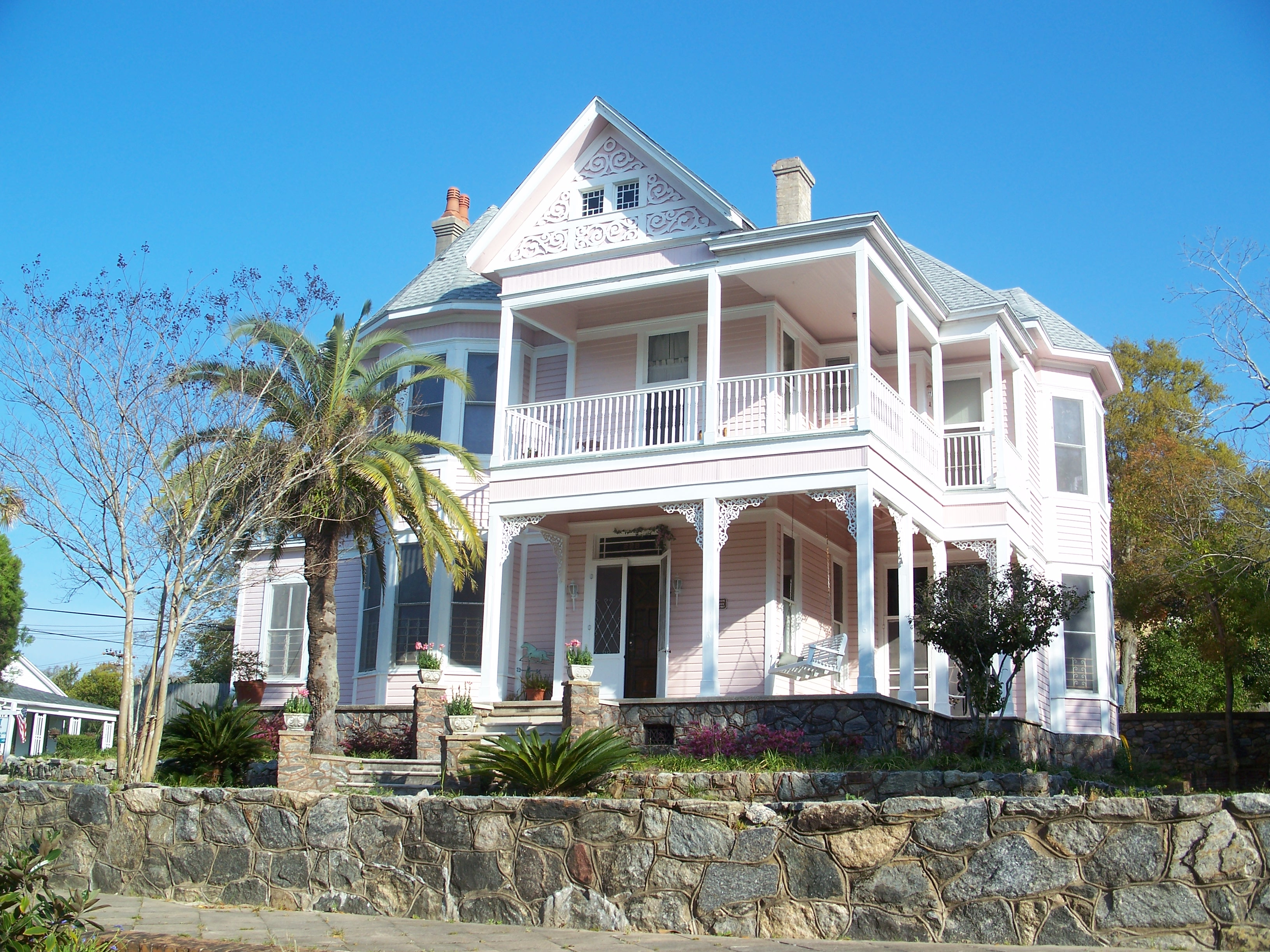
- House in the district

- Location within Florida Location within the United States
- Location: Roughly bounded by Blount, Palafox, Wright, Belmont, Reus, and DeVilliers Sts., Pensacola, Florida
- Coordinates: 30°25′14″N 87°13′14″W
- Area: 155.6 acres (0.630 km^{2})
- NRHP reference No.: 83001422
- Added to NRHP: May 9, 1983

The North Hill Preservation District is a U.S. historic district (designated as such on May 9, 1983) located in Pensacola, Florida. The district is bounded by Blount, Palafox, Wright, Belmont, Reus, and DeVilliers Streets. It contains 425 historic buildings and 1 object.

== See also ==
- Historical Marker Database
