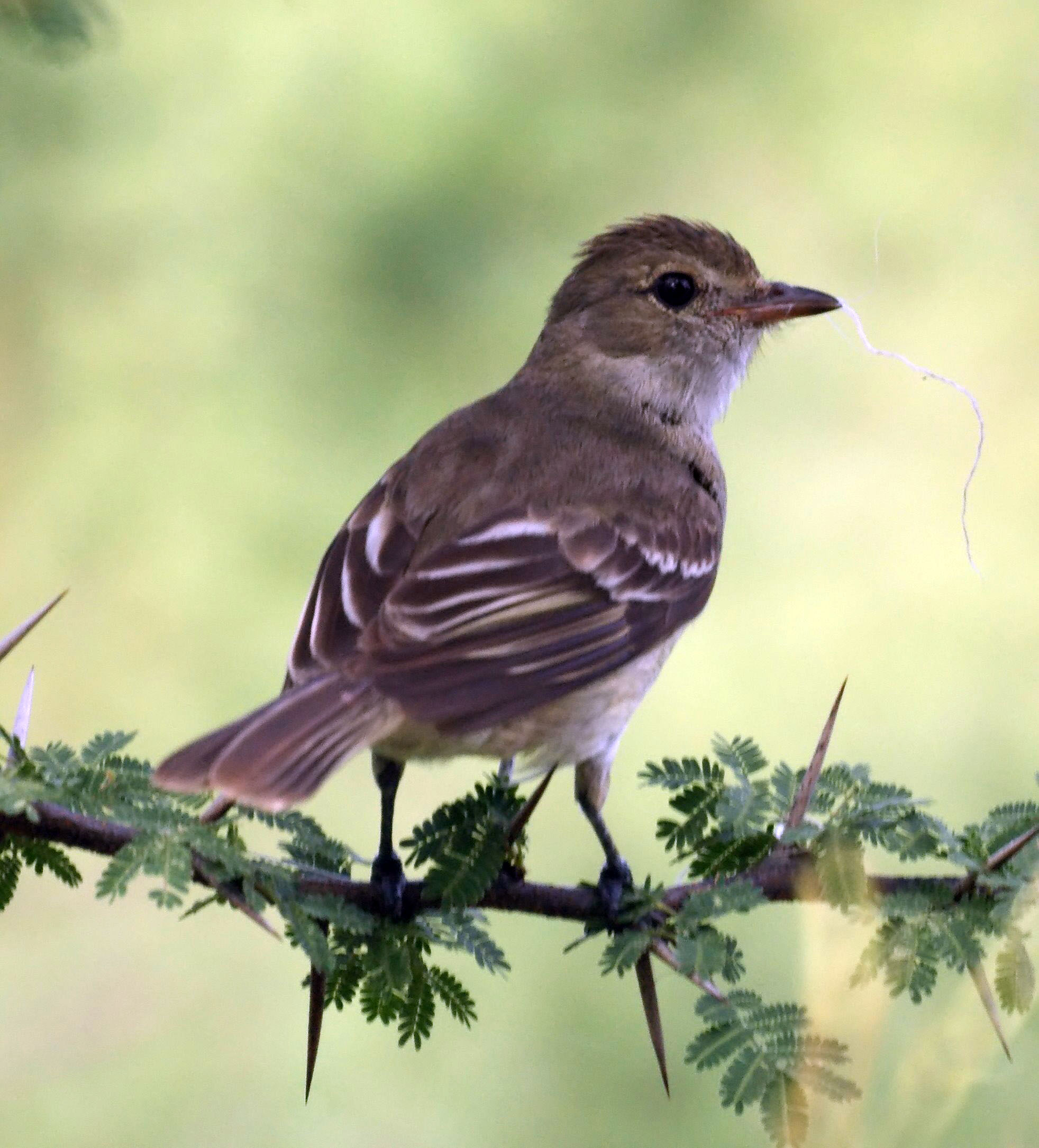

Conservation status
- Least Concern (IUCN 3.1)

Scientific classification
- Kingdom: Animalia
- Phylum: Chordata
- Class: Aves
- Order: Passeriformes
- Family: Tyrannidae
- Genus: Elaenia
- Species: E. martinica

Binomial name
- Elaenia martinica (Linnaeus, 1766)

Subspecies
- See text

Synonyms
- Muscicapa martinica Linnaeus, 1766

= Caribbean elaenia =

Species of bird

The Caribbean elaenia (Elaenia martinica) is a species of bird in subfamily Elaeniinae of family Tyrannidae, the tyrant flycatchers. It is found in the West Indies, in parts of Central America, and on islands just off the northern South American coast.

== Taxonomy and systematics ==
In 1760, the French zoologist Mathurin Jacques Brisson included a description of the Caribbean elaenia in his Ornithologie based on a specimen collected on the island of Martinique. He used the French name Le gobe-mouche hupé de la Martinique and the Latin Muscicapa Martinicana cristata. Although Brisson coined Latin names, these do not conform to the binomial system and are not recognised by the International Commission on Zoological Nomenclature. When in 1766 the Swedish naturalist Carl Linnaeus updated his Systema Naturae for the twelfth edition, he added 240 species that had been previously described by Brisson including the Caribbean elaenia. Linnaeus included a brief description, coined the binomial name Muscicapa martinica and cited Brisson's work. This species is now placed in the genus Elaenia that was introduced by the Swedish zoologist Carl Jakob Sundevall in 1836.

The Caribbean elaenia has these seven subspecies:

- E. m. riisii Sclater, 1860
- E. m. martinica (Linnaeus, 1766)
- E. m. barbadensis Cory, 1888
- E. m. remota Berlepsch, 1907
- E. m. chinchorrensis Griscom, 1926
- E. m. cinerescens Ridgway, 1884
- E. m. caymanensis Berlepsch, 1907

The Clements taxonomy groups E. m. riisii, E. m. martinica, and E. m. barbadensis as the Caribbean elaenia (Caribbean) and the other four subspecies as the Caribbean elaenia (Chinchorro). Some authors have suggested that the groups represent separate species.

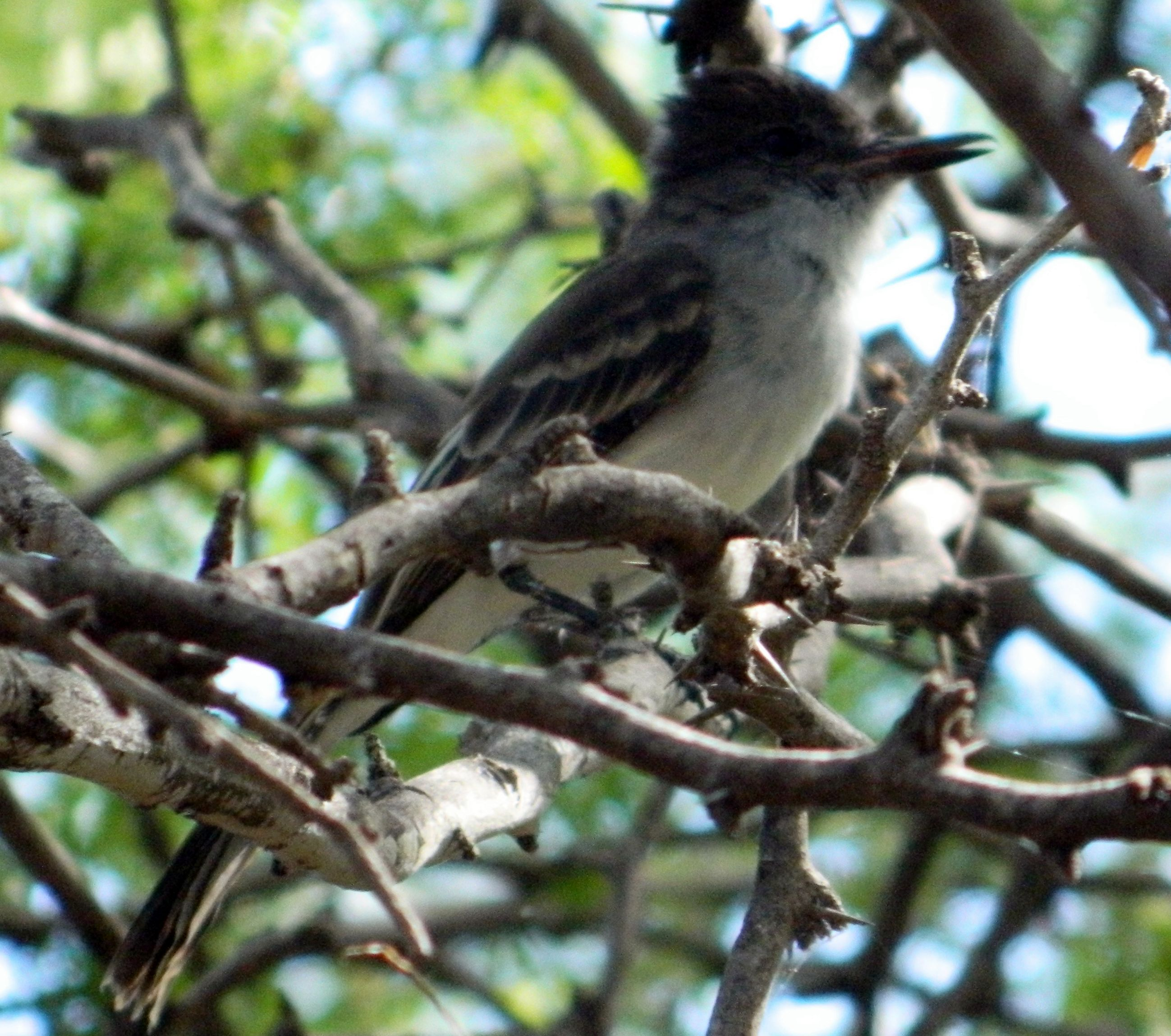
Caribbean elaenia in southwestern Puerto Rico

== Description ==
The Caribbean elaenia is 14 to 18 cm (5.5 to 7.1 in) long and weighs 18 to 29 g (0.63 to 1.0 oz). It is largish elaenia and has a bushy crest. The sexes have the same plumage. Adults of the nominate subspecies E. m. martinica have a dull olive to brownish olive crown with a white stripe in the middle of the crest. They have whitish lores and a faint whitish eyering on an otherwise mottled gray-brown face. Their upperparts are dull olive to brownish olive. Their wings are dusky with yellowish to whitish edges on the flight feathers and tips on the coverts; the latter show as two wing bars. Their tail is dusky. Their throat is sooty gray, their breast pale gray, their belly whitish to dull yellowish, and their undertail coverts yellowish to whitish.

The other subspecies of the Caribbean elaenia differ from the nominate and each other thus:

- E. m. riisii: smaller and overall paler than nominate
- E. m. barbadensis: larger than nominate with darker underparts
- E. m. remota: smaller than nominate with a browner rump and grayer throat and breast
- E. m. chinchorrensis: dark brownish (less greenish olive) upperparts than nominate with no yellow on the belly
- E. m. cinerescens: larger than nominate with a stronger yellow wash on the belly
- E. m. caymanensis: between riisii and nominate in size and overall paler than nominate

Both sexes of all subspecies have a dark brown iris, a black bill with a dusky pinkish base to the mandible, and black legs and feet.

== Distribution and habitat ==
The subspecies of the Caribbean elaenia are found thus:

- E. m. riisii: Puerto Rico and its offshore islands, the Virgin Islands, Anguilla, St. Martin, St. Bartholomew, Antigua, Barbuda, and Aruba, Bonaire, and Curaçao in the Netherlands Antilles (see (1) below)
- E. m. martinica: Lesser Antilles from Saba and St. Eustatius south to Grenada
- E. m. barbadensis: Barbados
- E. m. remota: Culebra Cay and Cozumel, Holbox, Meco, and Mujeres islands of Quintana Roo, southeastern Mexico
- E. m. chinchorrensis: on Great Cay Island off Quintana Roo, on Half Moon Caye, Middle Caye, Glover's Reef, Caye Caulker, and Ambergris Caye off Belize, and as a vagrant on the Belizean mainland (but see (2) below)
- E. m. cinerescens: San Andrés, Providéncia, and Santa Catalina islands off Nicaragua (but see (3) below)
- E. m. caymanensis: Cayman Islands

(1) A vagrant photographed and audio recorded in northwestern Florida, though not definitively, is possibly an individual of E. m. riisii. It is listed by the Florida Ornithological Society as "Elaenia species".

(2) The Clements taxonomy states that the population on the Belizean cayes may belong to E. m. remota.

(3) The Archipelago of San Andrés, Providencia and Santa Catalina is a department of Colombia but is east of Nicaragua and closer to that country than to mainland Colombia. The Clements taxonomy assigns the population there to E. m. cinerescens but places the archipelago "east of Honduras". Another taxonomic system does not name the archipelago but places E. m. cinerescens on "islands off Honduras". A third system places the archipelago's population in the "Caribbean" group without naming a subspecies.

The Caribbean elaenia inhabits most of the lowland landscapes within its range. It is found in the canopy and on the edges of humid evergreen forest, in deciduous woodland, scrublands, parks and gardens, open land with a scattering of trees and shrubs, and coastally in mangroves. It also occurs in the mountains of the southern Lesser Antilles. In elevation it ranges from sea level to about 700 m (2,300 ft).

== Behavior ==
=== Movement ===
The Caribbean elaenia is a year-round resident almost everywhere it occurs. Numbers on Puerto Rico fluctuate greatly, suggesting some dispersal to other islands. It occurs on Ambergris Caye only in winter.

=== Feeding ===
The Caribbean elaenia feeds on insects and fruit. It usually forages singly or in pairs and mostly in the lower to middle levels of its habitat. It captures prey and plucks fruit by gleaning while perched and while briefly hovering.

=== Breeding ===
The Caribbean elaenia breeds between January and September. Its nest is "a flimsy shallow cup" made of twigs, typically placed in a tree or shrub up to about 9 m (30 ft) above the ground. Its clutch is two or three eggs that are creamy white to creamy buff with darker markings. The incubation period, time to fledging, and details of parental care are not known.

=== Vocalization ===
The Caribbean elaenia's song is a "drawn-out pee-wee-reereeree". Its call is a repeated "jui-up, wit-churr".

== Status ==
The IUCN has assessed the Caribbean elaenia as being of Least Concern. It has a large range; its estimated population of at least 500,000 mature individuals is believed to be decreasing. No immediate threats have been identified. It is considered "generally common and widespread" in most of its range though rare in the Archipelago of San Andrés, Providencia and Santa Catalina. It is also considered "apparently less common" in the Netherlands Antilles.
