= 1968 Anguillian general election =

General elections were held in Anguilla on 30 July 1968.

== Background ==
Following the Anguillian Revolution in May 1967, a referendum on separating from St Kitts and Nevis was held on 11 July, in which 99.7% voted in favour of separation. Independence was declared the following day as the Republic of Anguilla.

A new constitution was drawn up that provided for a seven-member Legislative Council with five elected members and two appointed members. The first elections were planned for October, but only five candidates stood for the five seats, and all were returned unopposed, with no vote taking place.

Fresh elections were scheduled for July 1968. Contrary to the constitution, seven members were elected and none appointed.

== Results ==
Only two of the seven seats were contested, with Emile Gumbs defeating the incumbent Hugo Rey in Road North and incumbent Wallace Rey defeating Clement Daniels in Valley South. Atlin Harrigan, Kenneth Hazel, Collins Hodge, John Hodge and Ronald Webster were elected unopposed.

== Aftermath ==
The British government took control of Anguilla in 1969, with members of the 1968 council allowed to continue in office. Seven additional members were appointed to the Legislative Council; Camille Connor, Samuel Fleming, Winston Harrigan, Reuben Hodge, Hugo Rey, Russell Webster and James Woods.
