= Seal Island, Anguilla =

Island in the United Kingdom

Seal Island
- Location within Anguilla Location within the Caribbean

Geography
- Location: Atlantic Ocean
- Coordinates: 18°16′6″N 63°8′43″W
- Archipelago: Antilles

Administration
- United Kingdom
- British Overseas Territory: Anguilla

Demographics
- Population: 0

Additional information
- Time zone: AST (UTC-4)

Seal Island is an islet off the northwest coast of Anguilla. Coral reefs separate it from the mainland, with the reef system itself being designated as a marine park. Multiple species of marine life lie in the reefs, which include species of turtle, reef fish, and Panulirus guttatus often being fished for. The reef has received some damage due to factors such as fishing impacts, though the island itself still attracts tourists due to its location for snorkeling and scuba diving.

== Geography and status ==
Seal Island is an islet of Anguilla off its northwest coast. Around eight kilometres of reef separates Seal Island with the mainland. Along with Dog, Scrub, Little Scrub, Prickly Pear Cays, and Sombrero islets, Seal Island is located on the drowned Anguilla Bank, and is nearly awash. Described as having an "eel shape", it is located two kilometres to the east of the Prickly Pear Cays, and lies at the centre of the Seal Island Reef System Marine Park. The island itself is sparsely vegetated.

With the Prickly Pear Cays, the Seal Island Reefs were designated as a marine park by the Department of Fisheries and Marine Resources. The reef has degraded over multiple decades due to hurricane damage, fishing, and coral diseases. Due to this, restrictions on anchoring and spearfishing have been put in place.

== Fauna ==
Species such as endangered sea turtles, which include the hawksbill sea turtle and green sea turtle, can be found on the Prickly Pear & Seal Island Reef. Panulirus guttatus can also be found in the Seal Island reef system, often being fished for. The reef itself houses hard and soft coral, with multiple types of reef fish.

== Tourism ==
The island is a popular destination for scuba divers and snorkelers due to it lying on the Seal Island Reef System Marine Park. Though it is a popular destination, the island itself is hard to access due to the reef that stretches from the island to mainland Anguilla.
