= 1967 Anguillian general election =

General elections were planned to be held in Anguilla on 25 October 1967 following the Anguillian Revolution in May. However, only five candidates stood for the five seats, with all elected unopposed.

== Background ==
The St Kitts-Nevis-Anguilla federation was established in February 1967, but was unpopular on Anguilla. In March Government House was burnt down and the island's warden fled to St Kitts. On 30 May the federation police were forcibly ejected from the island and a "Peace Keeping Committee" installed as a government, chaired by Walter Hodge. A referendum on separating from St Kitts and Nevis was held on 11 July, in which 99.7% voted in favour of separation. Independence was declared the following day as the Republic of Anguilla.

A new constitution was drafted by Roger Fisher of Harvard University in July 1967, which provided for a seven-seat Legislative Council, of which five were elected and two were appointed, and elections were scheduled for 25 October. A new political party, the Anguilla Democratic Party, was set up to contest the elections. However, this caused division within the island's leadership and the party was disbanded in mid-October.

== Results ==
Although seven candidates were initially announced, two withdrew (Camile Connor and Charles Fleming), leaving only five on nomination day, 17 October (Collins Hodge, John Hodge, Hugo Rey, Wallace Rey and Ronald Webster). The five were declared elected unopposed.

The newly elected Council met on 21 October and Webster was elected chair. Bob Rogers and Campbell Fleming were appointed as the nominated members.
