= Flirt Rocks =

Islands in Anguilla

- Location within Anguilla Location within the Caribbean

Geography
- Location: Atlantic Ocean
- Coordinates: 18°16′36″N 63°10′48″W
- Archipelago: Antilles

Administration
- United Kingdom
- British Overseas Territory: Anguilla

Additional information
- Time zone: AST (UTC-4)
- ISO code: AI

Flirt Rocks are two small, uninhabited, rocky islets off of Anguilla, in the Leeward Islands of the Caribbean. They are located 0.75 miles (1.21 km) north of the Prickly Pear Cays. Seal Reef is situated east of the Flirt Rocks.

The islets consist of the Great and Little Flirt Rocks. The Great Flirt (18°16′36″N 63°10′49″W) is approximately 20 feet (6.1 m) above sea level while Little Flirt (18°16′30″N 63°10′32″W) is approximately 8 feet (2.4 m) to 10 feet (3.0 m) above sea level.
