= Dolphin Flag =

1967 flag of Anguilla

The Dolphin Flag. Ratio: 3:5

Version of the flag used at sea. Ratio: 1:2

The Dolphin Flag of Anguilla was adopted on 29 September 1967, after the colony (then part of Saint Christopher-Nevis-Anguilla) unilaterally declared independence from the United Kingdom as the Republic of Anguilla. It depicted three orange dolphins in a circle on a white background with a turquoise stripe at the bottom. It was used until 19 March 1969, when British rule was restored.

The white background on the flag represents peace. The turquoise stripe represents the Caribbean Sea. The three dolphins represent endurance, unity, and strength, and their circular arrangement represents community.

The flag was designed by Marvin Oberman and Lydia Gumbs. It replaced the earlier "Mermaid Flag" of Anguilla, designed by Scott Newhall, which had been in use since 23 July 1967.

Although no longer official, the Dolphin Flag is still flown today.

== Mermaid Flag ==
The Mermaid Flag

Republic of Anguilla briefly used the mermaid flag in 1967 and only changed it to the dolphin flag in July 1967.

== See also ==
- Flag of Anguilla – the current territorial flag of Anguilla
