= Flag of Anguilla =

Anguilla
- Use: Civil and state flag, state ensign
- Proportion: 1:2
- Adopted: 30 May 1990 (modified coat of arms on 25 January 1999)
- Design: A Blue Ensign charged in the fly with the coat of arms of Anguilla
- Use: Civil ensign
- Proportion: 1:2

The national flag of Anguilla, a British overseas territory, consists of a Blue Ensign with the British flag in the canton, charged with the coat of arms of Anguilla in the fly. The coat of arms consists of three dolphins in a circular formation, which were featured on the earlier Anguilla flag, and which stand for unity, strength and endurance (And in other interpretations, friendship, wisdom and strength). The white in the background stands for peace, and the light blue represents the sea, as well as faith, youth, and hope.

The flag is Anguilla's third flag other than as part of Saint Christopher-Nevis-Anguilla. The island's first flag was a red flag featuring the name of the island in yellow and two mermaids inside a blue oval. Variants to this flag were also widely used, with some substituting red for purple and some not bearing the name of Anguilla. This flag was widely disliked and was replaced during Anguilla's brief period of independence by the Dolphin Flag, which is still widely seen around the island. This flag was a banner of the arms found on the current Blue Ensign, and was white with a broad blue band across the base of the flag, above which were three stylised golden dolphins.

== Design ==
The flag is a blue ensign, a flag design common in both current and former British colonies, a blue field with the Union Jack in the canton (top left). It also features the Coat of arms of Anguilla as a charge in the fly.

=== Colours ===
The colours on the Anguillan flag are the following:

Scheme	Blue	Red	Orange	Blue
Pantone (Paper)	281 C	186 C	150 C	291 C
Web colours	#00205B	#C8102E	#FFB25B	#9BCBEB
RGB	0, 32, 91	200, 16, 46	255, 178, 91	155, 203, 235
CMYK	100%, 65%, 0%, 64%	0%, 92%, 77%, 22%	0%, 30%, 64%, 0%	34%, 14%, 0%, 8%

== History ==
=== Coat of arms ===
Anguilla became a colony of the Kingdom of England in 1650, when settlers from Saint Kitts moved to the island. A legislative union between the two islands was later established in 1825, despite vehement opposition from Anguillan freeholders over the arrangement of having Saint Kitts pass laws for both areas. Anguillans appealed to the British government in 1872 calling for an end to the union and direct rule, but this was disregarded. A decade later, a federal act resulted in the amalgamation of Saint Kitts, Nevis, and Anguilla under the British Leeward Islands federation.

In 1956 the Leeward Islands federation was dissolved. Two years later a unitary political entity called the West Indies Federation was created; Saint Kitts, Nevis, and Anguilla joined the federation upon its creation. This new federation dissolved in 1962, but five years later the three islands became an Associated State. However, this was once more against the will of the Anguillan people. They consequently expelled the Saint Kitts police, seceded from the union, and declared the Republic of Anguilla. During this time, a flag with three orange dolphins and a blue stripe at the bottom (dubbed the Three Dolphins flag) was unofficially adopted as the banner of the unrecognised state. British rule was soon restored and the Anguilla Act 1971 placed the island under direct rule from London. Nine years later, Anguilla was accorded its own constitution and its union with Saint Kitts and Nevis officially ended.

=== Modern flag ===
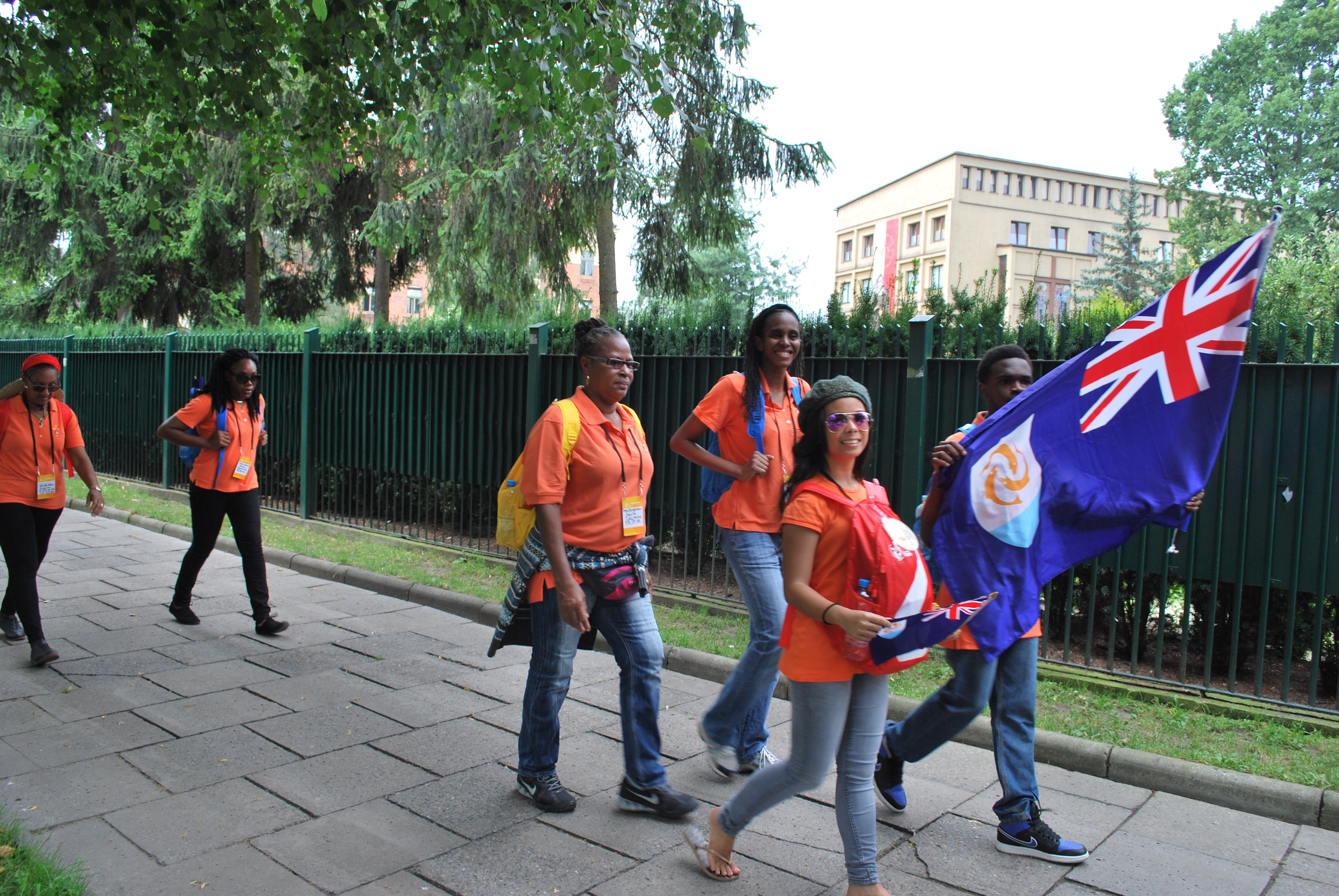
Young people with Anguillan flag at World Youth Day 2016

The Blue Ensign featuring the arms was adopted in 1990. It is used on land; it is also used at sea by vessels operated by the Government of Anguilla.

A modification of the flag was reported on 25 January 1999, in the British Navy flag book as Change No. 5 1999: The dimensions of the badge have been slightly altered and the coat of arms lost its golden border.

== Other flags of Anguilla ==
Anguilla's civil ensign is the undifferenced Red Ensign, commonly used as a civil ensign throughout the British Empire. Anguilla has not yet adopted a distinctive version of the Red Ensign.

Ashore, the dolphin flag is commonly used as an all-purpose civil flag, either in place of or in addition to the Blue Ensign.

The Dolphin Flag (1967–1969)

The mermaid flag (1967)

The Union Jack defaced with the Anguilla coat of arms is used by the Governor, which is the traditional design for Governors of the British overseas territories.

Flag of the Governor of Anguilla

Flag of the Governor of Anguilla (1990–1999)
