= 1969 Anguillian constitutional referendum =

6 February 1969
- A: Affirm declaration and approve Constitution Government of the people of Anguilla. B: Reject declaration [and] Constitution[,] return to St. Kitts.

Results
Choice	Votes	%
Independence	1,739	99.77%
Return to St. Kitts	4	0.23%
Valid votes	1,743	96.14%
Invalid or blank votes	70	3.86%
Total votes	1,813	100.00%
Registered voters/turnout		75%

A constitutional referendum was held in Anguilla on 6 February 1969. Following the 1967 uprising on the island, which had seen the local police force expelled, a referendum on separation was held. On 8 January 1969 Ronald Webster declared independence. A republican constitution was put forward and approved by 99.71% of voters. After the referendum, British troops occupied the island on 19 March.

Webster later proposed a referendum with three options; independence, association with the UK or remaining in the Saint Christopher-Nevis-Anguilla federation. Option two was later introduced without a vote, and Anguilla was administered separately from 1971, before being officially separated from Saint Kitts and Nevis in 1980.

== Results ==
Choice	Votes	%
For	1,739	99.77
Against	4	0.23
Total	1,743	100.00
Valid votes	1,743	96.14
Invalid/blank votes	70	3.86
Total votes	1,813	100.00
Registered voters/turnout		75
Source: Direct Democracy
