= Coat of arms of Anguilla =

- Armiger: Anguilla
- Adopted: 27 November 1990
- Crest: An Eel (Anguilla Anguilla) haurient proper crowned with an Ancient Crown Or
- Shield: Argent in base the Sea of Turquoise hue in chief three natural Dolphins embowed and leaping in a circle each tinctured Orange-Gold the Shield garnished of Gold
- Supporters: Dexter An Anguillan Fisherman proper wearing trousers rolled up to the knee Azure with a cloth waistband Or holding with his dexter hand a Strap Sable suspended therefrom by the mouth two pot fish namely a Jack Fish and a Red Snapper proper Sinister An Anguillan Woman vested in an ankle and wrist length Robe and Head Wrap Azure thereover an Apron Argent the lower hem and tied round the waist with an Orange-Gold band holding by the Stalk a Maize Plant leaved Vert fructed proper

The coat of arms of Anguilla is the heraldic device consisting of a shield charged with three orange dolphins leaping over the sea. Adopted in 1990, it has been the coat of arms of Anguilla since that year. The escutcheon is featured on the flag of the territory.

== History ==
Anguilla became a colony of the Kingdom of England in 1650, when settlers from Saint Kitts moved to the island. A legislative union between the two islands was later established in 1825, despite vehement opposition from Anguillan freeholders over the arrangement of having Saint Kitts pass laws for both areas. Anguillans appealed to the British government in 1872 calling for an end to the union and direct rule, but this was disregarded. A decade later, a federal act resulted in the amalgamation of Saint Kitts, Nevis, and Anguilla under the British Leeward Islands federation.

Coat of arms of the Republic of Anguilla from 1967 to 1969.

In 1956 the Leeward Islands federation was dissolved. Two years later a unitary political entity called the West Indies Federation was created; Saint Kitts, Nevis, and Anguilla joined the federation upon its creation. This new federation dissolved in 1962, but five years later the three islands became an Associated State. However, this was once more against the will of the Anguillan people. They consequently expelled the Saint Kitts police, seceded from the union, and declared the Republic of Anguilla. During this time, a flag with three orange dolphins and a blue stripe at the bottom (dubbed the Three Dolphins flag) was unofficially adopted as the banner of the unrecognised state. British rule was soon restored and the Anguilla Act 1971 placed the island under direct rule from London. Nine years later, Anguilla was accorded its own constitution and its union with Saint Kitts and Nevis officially ended.

The territory's constitution was amended in 1990, and a new flag was first raised on 30 May that year. It consisted of Blue Ensign with a shield that incorporated the design of the Three Dolphins flag. Later that same year, on 27 November, a Royal Warrant was issued granting Anguilla its own shield. In the run-up to the fiftieth anniversary of the Anguillian Revolution in 2017, a proposal was drawn up to augment the coat of arms with a crest and two supporters, along with the territory's motto. The design was submitted for approval in March of that year, with the College of Arms overseeing its technical aspects. A crest and supporters were formally granted by Elizabeth II on 30 January 2020.

== Design ==
=== Official description ===
The official blazon granted by the British College of Arms is as follows: Argent in base the Sea of Turquoise hue in chief three natural Dolphins embowed and leaping in a circle each tinctured Orange-Gold the Shield garnished of Gold.

The official description also includes a crest and supporters which are currently unused. The crest is An Eel (Anguilla Anguilla) haurient proper crowned with an Ancient Crown Or, while the supporters are Dexter An Anguillan Fisherman proper wearing trousers rolled up to the knee Azure with a cloth waistband Or holding with his dexter hand a Strap Sable suspended therefrom by the mouth two pot fish namely a Jack Fish and a Red Snapper proper Sinister An Anguillan Woman vested in an ankle and wrist length Robe and Head Wrap Azure thereover an Apron Argent the lower hem and tied round the waist with an Orange-Gold band holding by the Stalk a Maize Plant leaved Vert fructed proper.

=== Symbolism ===
The colours and objects on the coat of arms carry cultural, political, and regional meanings. The white background epitomises peace and tranquility. The blue at the bottom evokes the surrounding Caribbean Sea, as well as faith, youth and hope. The three dolphins symbolise unity, strength and endurance. This is also the motto of the territory. The circle they are arranged in represents continuity.

=== Uses ===
The shield from the arms features on the flag of Anguilla and on the standard of the territory's governor.
