= Operation Sheepskin =

1969 British military operation

Date	March 1969
Location	Anguilla, Caribbean
Result	British rule re-established.

Belligerents
United Kingdom	Republic of Anguilla

Commanders and leaders
(United Kingdom) Anthony Lee (British Commissioner)	(Republic of Anguilla) Ronald Webster

Strength
2 Royal Navy frigates, 300 troops of the Parachute Regiment and 22 police officers	Anguilla Police

Casualties and losses
None	All Anguillan police units surrendered.

Operation Sheepskin was a British military operation in the Caribbean, aimed at restoring British rule to the island of Anguilla, after the island had declared itself as an independent Republic. The British government dispatched two Royal Navy ships and 300 soldiers of the 2nd Battalion, Parachute Regiment and 9 Independent Parachute Squadron RE alongside 22 officers of the London Metropolitan Police to restore order to the island. The operation was a success and British troops were met with limited resistance by the islanders, as they had wanted direct association with Great Britain, separate from Saint Kitts and Nevis, of which they were then a part.

== Background ==
On 27 February 1967, Britain granted the territory of Saint Christopher-Nevis-Anguilla the status of "associated state", with its own constitution and a considerable degree of self-government. Throughout its history, Anguilla was a neglected territory with a small population known for its poverty, bouts of starvation, harsh living conditions and arid land unfit for large-scale agriculture. By 1967, the situation on the island remained arduous; unlike most of their island neighbours, Anguilla lacked electricity, clean water, and the roads were severely inadequate. The neglect and rough conditions were compounded by the association with Saint Kitts and Nevis, as most aid and development went to the main island of Saint Kitts. Anguillians had petitioned against administration through Saint Kitts several times in the decades prior, but to no avail. Anguilla's lack of direct association with the metropole meant limited contact with Great Britain and insubstantial local government representation. The Anguillian populace felt as though they were under a double yoke of colonialism. The Chief Minister and later Premier of Saint Christopher-Nevis-Anguilla, Robert Llewellyn Bradshaw, did not help matters by expressing his disdain for the island and dismissing concerns from the Anguillian public.

This led most Anguillians to view Bradshaw as authoritarian and many felt that he was unfairly depriving the small island of revenue, investment, and infrastructure. Many Anguillans strenuously objected to the continuing political subservience to Saint Kitts, and a grassroots insurgency soon developed. 1967 saw many demonstrations, protests, and acts of political violence to voice opposition to associated statehood. On February 4, a Queen Show Beauty Pageant supported by the Saint Kitts Government was interrupted by stone-throwing separatists. A riot broke out, and the stone throwers retreated after a clash with the Kittitian Police when they used tear gas and opened fire to try and quell the riot. This was the first of several clashes with the police stationed in Anguilla. This all came to a boiling point when on 30 May 1967 (known as Anguilla Day), the Kittitian police were forcibly evicted from the island. This expulsion led Anguilla to be viewed as a rogue state and a local island council was formed. The provisional government requested United States administration, which was declined. Bradshaw tried drumming up support for an invasion to restore order but failed to find a willing partner in Britain or within the Caribbean. In the interim Bradshaw suspended the postal service and blocked transactions to the only bank on the island. Isolated but resolute, the Anguillians formed a small peacekeeping defence force to guard the coastlines, and the dust strip was blocked by local vehicles and oil cans to prevent an air landing. On 9 June 1967, an attack on Saint Kitts was launched by an 18-man party of Anguillians via boat to overthrow the government. This was done in part with the support of the People's Action Movement party in Saint Kitts which also opposed Bradshaw. The coup was a failure as only 12 men landed, 5 of whom were captured and later stood trial. On 11 July 1967, a referendum on Anguilla's secession from the fledgling state was held. The results were 1,813 votes for secession and five against. A declaration of independence (written mainly by Harvard Law professor Roger Fisher) was read publicly by Walter Hodge, declaring Anguilla as an independent Republic.

As tensions persisted, the plight of the Anguillians garnered much media attention, with several outsiders, as well as diasporic Anguillians, lending support. On July 25, 1967, a conference was held in Barbados to try and negotiate, headed by British Minister for Commonwealth Relations, Lord Shepherd, alongside delegates from Anguilla, Saint Kitts and Nevis, Barbados, Guyana, and Trinidad and Tobago. After much tense negotiations, an agreement was reached. The agreement let Anguilla retain a level of self-governance in the form of an island council, but ultimately would still be tied to Saint Kitts and Nevis. It was also determined that an international policing military force would be stationed there for peacekeeping purposes. Back in Anguilla, the agreement was ill-received, and changes were demanded. Originally led by Anguilla's sole elected representative in Basseterre, Peter Adams, the mantle of leader was passed on to the more militant and anti-colonial Ronald Webster. Still unsatisfied, Webster and the majority of Anguillians were adamant about a completely separate Anguilla. When it became clear that the people wouldn't accept statehood, other leaders in the region withdrew support for the agreement, and the international peacekeeping force was scrapped. Bradshaw focused on the rearmament of local forces and the reintegration of Anguilla, initially seeing the conference as a victory. More eyes were drawn to the conflict when a member of the council and US Army Veteran, Jeremiah Gumbs, alongside Ronald Webster, took the plight of Anguilla to the United Nations. After much back and forth, Britain sent a delegation in December 1967 to broker a new interim agreement that saw British civil servant Tony Lee administer the island for a year. Initially viewed as a reasonable solution, over time, it became clear that the interim agreement was only meant to delay reintegration back into associated statehood. The British government proposed an extended stay for Lee, which further exacerbated the tensions. Meanwhile, Webster had become fond of the idea of total independence even from Britain. On February 6, 1969, a new referendum was held to determine whether to sever all ties with Britain and establish an independent republic with an American-style constitution. A total of 1,739 voted in favor and only 4 against it. The Constitution was drafted by American businessman, Jack Holcomb, and included a Bill of Rights, establishing that a president, a vice-president, and an 11-person unicameral legislature would lead the country. In addition, it asserted the right to declare war and establish a navy and other armed forces.

On 11 March 1969, the British government sent William Whitlock, a junior minister, as a diplomatic envoy to Anguilla in an effort to resolve the conflict and establish an interim British administration. Whitlock's proposal was rejected in part because of his treatment of the local Anguillians. Despite being greeted with British flags and chants of "God Save the Queen", Whitlock was curt and dismissive. His methods of diplomacy included a brief condescending speech, carelessly throwing leaflets at a gathered crowd, hardly acknowledging the local head of government, refusing the motorcade service arranged for him, and snubbing the plans he had made for lunch with local leader Ronald Webster. Whitlock and his delegation were subsequently ejected from the island via gunpoint. Whitlock returned to Britain, reporting the ordeal, as well as mischaracterizing the island as being run by mafia-like gangsterism and foreign influence.

== Operation Sheepskin ==
On 19 March 1969, a contingent of 300 troops from the 2nd Battalion, Parachute Regiment, plus 22 London Metropolitan Police officers, peacefully landed by helicopter and landing craft on the island from two Royal Navy frigates, ostensibly to "restore order".

Not a single shot was fired during the operation, and British troops were greeted by foreign journalists and Anguillians. The invasion was met with indignation by some Anguillians, but the soldiers encountered no resistance and found no elements of intimidation, mafia presence, or even the expected firearms (most had been hidden by the locals). The British soldiers then worked on a 'hearts and minds' campaign whilst on the island to improve relations with the islanders. Six weeks after the operation had taken place, the initial paratroopers were flown back to Britain and a second force of paratroopers (B Company) stayed on the island until 14 September 1969 to maintain security.

The invasion drew ire and ridicule at home and abroad, with the world press dubbing it "the Bay of Piglets". A global public relations embarrassment, Operation Sheepskin ultimately helped contribute to the defeat of Harold Wilson at the 1970 general election. Eventually, the islanders became amicable with the political situation and civil strife was limited following the operation. Anguilla officially seceded from Saint Kitts and Nevis in 1980, and Saint Kitts and Nevis gained independence in 1983. The island of Anguilla remains a British territory to this day.
