= Heritage Collection Museum =

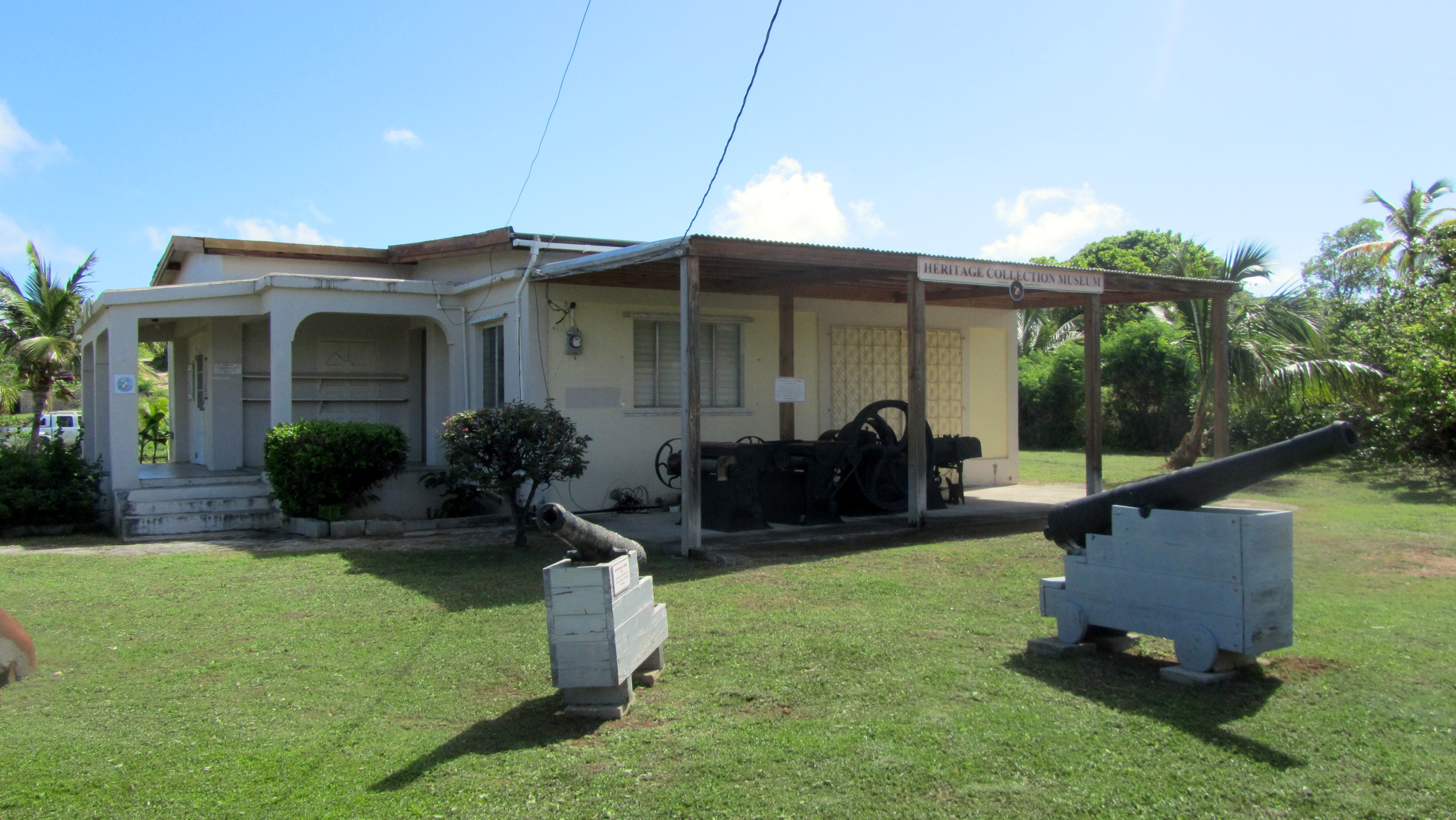
- Heritage Collection Museum in 2014
- Location: East End
- Coordinates: 18.236163°N 62.996747°W

The Heritage Collection Museum was a museum located in the East End district of Anguilla. The museum was established in 1996 by Colville Petty, O.B.E, who worked as the curator of the museum until 2024. The museum closed in March 2024, handing over its collection to the government in order to form the collection of a new state museum.

== History ==
The museum was established in 1996 by Colville Petty from his private collection. Originally located in the South Hill area of the island, it later relocated to the East End, occupying a bungalow next to the salt pond.It was the only museum in Anguilla.

In March 2024, the Heritage Collection Museum handed over its artefacts to the government to ensure their preservation and display in the newly designated Anguilla National Museum at the Old Court House. The restoration of the Old Court House was funded by Michael Taylor, and overseen by the Anguilla Archaeological and Historical Society, taking place throughout 2020 and 2021. The Old Court House was used as the seat of the Council in Anguilla since the 1700s, as well as holding prisoners of war during the French invasion, and serving as an emergency hurricane shelter in 1955 during Hurricane Alice. As of 2025, the restorations are complete however the new museum is yet to open.

== Collections ==
Inside, the museum offered a view of the island's history through a variety of objects from different eras. These included artifacts from the ancient Arawaks, the visit of Queen Elizabeth II in 1994, the period of slavery, migrations to the Dominican Republic and Great Britain in the 20th century, and the Anguillan Revolution in 1967 with the proclamation of the Republic of Anguilla.
