= Bankie Banx =

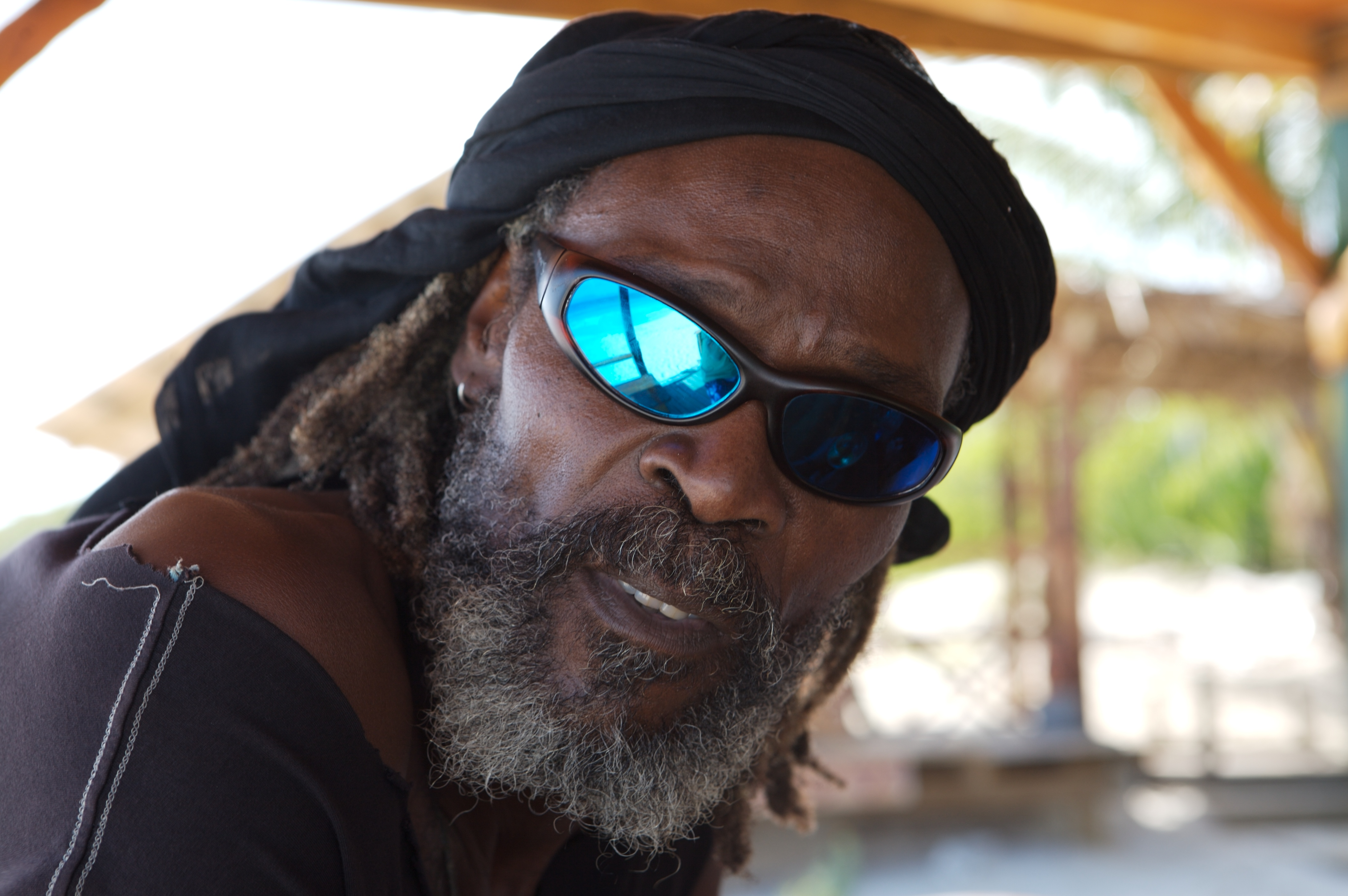

Background information
- Born: Clement Ashley Banks; 13 November 1953 (age 72); Anguilla
- Genres: Reggae
- Occupations: Singer-songwriter, musician
- Instruments: Vocals, guitar
- Years active: 1967–present
- Labels: Urban Country, Zemi Music
- Website: https://www.bankiebanx.net

Bankie Banx (born Clement Ashley Banks; 1953 in Anguilla) is a reggae singer, known as the "Anguillan Bob Dylan".

== Career ==
Banks's musical career dates back to 1963, when he built his first guitar. He formed his first band in 1967, taking inspiration from the UK top 40 hits that a local radio station transmitted from a frigate moored off the coast of the island.

Bankie's first number one hit in 1977 was "Prince of Darkeness" and followed that with several chart topping songs over the next few years. With the release of his first album Roots and Herbs in 1978, recorded with his band, The Roots and Herbs, Banks pioneered reggae music in the Eastern Caribbean.

Following the releases of the album, Where I and I Abide, Bankie became the first performer from Anguilla to appear at Reggae Sunsplash, in 1983 and he appeared again in 1992. He was featured during a live Moonsplash performance in the ground-breaking reggae documentary Cool Runnings. Following his success has Reggae Sunsplash 1983, Bankie and his band The Roots & Herbs toured extensively in the Caribbean before heading to Europe. Discord prior to the Europe trip caused the band to change form, and several founding members left the band including Ras B, Iwandai I and Irino. The band spent three years in Europe and garnered a strong fan-base while there. Bankie returned to be with his family after the death of his younger sister.

Bankie spent the late 1980s in New York City and worked with musicians including Junior Jazz, Robert Manos, Robert Mansfield. Bankie Banx and The New York Connection were regulars on the East Coast music scene and had strong followings in Boston, New York and New Hampshire. Bankie continued to return to Anguilla for annual performances and started the Moonsplash Music Festival in 1991, staged in the grounds of his own bar, The Dune Preserve. Moonsplash has become one of the premier music festivals in the Eastern Caribbean and has featured internationally revered artists. Artists who have appeared at the Dune Preserve include David Bryan of Bon Jovi, Jimmy Buffett, Rita Marley, Richie Havens, The Bacon Brothers, Black Uhuru, Freddie McGregor, Peter Cetera, Third World, Culture, Steel Pulse, David Hinds, Tarrus Riley, Duane Stephenson, Marcia Griffiths, Derrick Morgan, Roots & Herbs, Buju Banton, Gramps Morgan, Anthony B, Burning Spear, The Wailers Band, Inner Circle (reggae band), Toots & the Maytals, Benjy Myaz, Alana Davis, Junior Jazz, Orange Grove, Corey Stoot, Onaje Allan Gumbs and John Mayer. The bar was destroyed by Hurricane Lenny in 1999, but Banks rebuilt it and Moonsplash went ahead again in 2000.

Bankie has made several international television appearances, including a recurring role on the Fox sitcom Key West and a February 2011 guest concert appearance on The Bachelor, and has been featured on the soundtrack for the award-winning independent film Southie.

Bankie's sound has been described as a cross between Bob Marley and Bob Dylan, and his music a blend of folk, reggae, R&B and jazz. He is often called the "Anguillan Bob Dylan", and indeed has played with Dylan himself.

In Summer 2005, Bankie started the Project Stingray music and arts education program on Anguilla. Bankie's fall tour of the United States supported awareness and raised funds for the Stingray Program. Through his fund-raising efforts Bankie was able to donate 30 brand new guitars to the Stingray Program during the Cultural and Arts Fair at Moonsplash 2006. During a Jimmy Buffett charity event hosted by Bankie Banx at The Dune Preserve, Bankie raised over one hundred thousand for local charities.

In 2006, Bankie released his music video promo for "Big Chief", taken from his 2003 album, Chariots of Steel. The video told the story of a young island boy discovering his roots and was shot on location in Anguilla. Scenes were also shot in neighbouring St. Martin. The video was made by Driftwood Pictures, and was produced by Yoni Gal, directed by Trishul Thejasvi and Production Managed by Karsten Hansen.

Bankie's next studio album, The News, was released on 15 September 2009. The first single from the album, "King of the Dune", was released 18 August 2009 on iTunes.

On 17 January 2012, Bankie released his latest studio album, entitled Just Cool.

It has also been said by writers such as Lasana M. Sekou that while Bankie is widely known for his music and unique singing voice and generally not thought of as a writer of verse, Bankie is undoubtedly one of Anguilla's "accomplished poets." The poetry of Bankie Banx can be found in the new anthology Where I See The Sun – Contemporary Poetry in Anguilla (2015).

== Albums ==
- Roots and Herbs (1978) Banx Music
- Where I and I Abide (1982) Banx Music
- Soothe Your Soul (1982) Redemption Records
- Terrestrial Spirits (1989) Urban Country/Banx Music
- Island Boy (1991) Urban Country/Banx Music
- Mighty Wind (1996) Urban Country/Banx Music
- Still In Paradise (1999) Banx Music
- Chariots Of Steel (2003) Banx Music
- The News: Live From The 4th World (2009) Banx Music
- Just Cool (2012) Banx Music

== Awards and recognition ==
- 2015 The presidents Award 13th annual St. Martin Book Fair
