= Sandy Island (Anguilla) =

Island in Anguilla

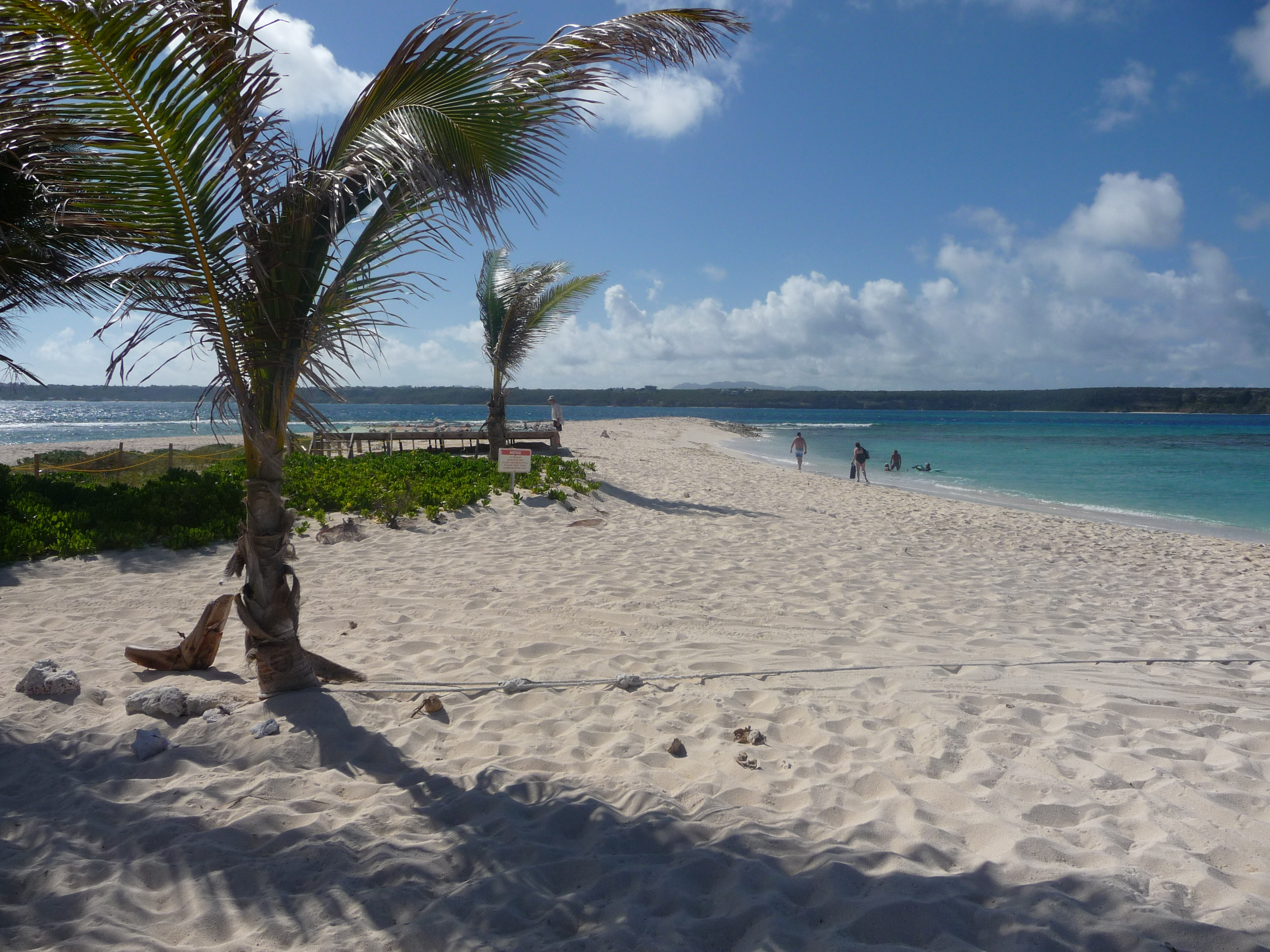
- Sandy Island

- Location of Sandy Island within Anguilla

- Location within Anguilla Location within the Caribbean

Geography
- Location: Atlantic Ocean
- Coordinates: 18°12′45.35″N 63°7′5.92″W
- Archipelago: Antilles

Administration
- United Kingdom
- British Overseas Territory: Anguilla

Additional information
- Time zone: AST (UTC-4)
- ISO code: AI

Sandy Island is an island in Anguilla, a British Overseas Territory, and is part of the Lesser Antilles in the Caribbean Sea.

Sandy Island is a small island on which a local restaurant is located. From Sandy Ground, it can be reached in 15 minutes, and the owner of the restaurant provides free boat crossing. The island is small (ca. 250x75 meters), consisting of round white sands with a little vegetation in the middle, including shrubs and palm trees.

The island is popular with tourists for the richness of its seabed and its beach of fine sand and coral, as well as for the presence of a well known bar/restaurant in the area.

In 1995, the island was submerged by Hurricane Luis for some days, while the facilities were severely damaged by the passage of the next several tropical cyclones and, during one of these storms, vessel went aground on the island. The buildings were rebuilt later.

Even the flora was damaged by tropical storms, the palm trees and shrubs were uprooted by strong winds giving the island an aspect even more barren, almost without vegetation.

The restaurant was re-built in 2007, however in 2017, Hurricane Irma destroyed the buildings and vegetation, leaving a bare sand bar.
