= Prickly Pear Cays =

Uninhabited Caribbean islands

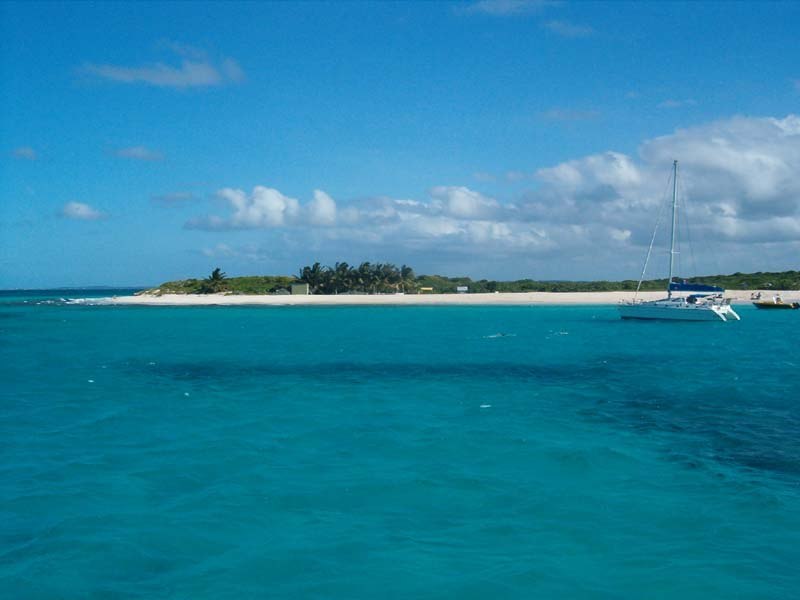
- Prickly Pear Cays

- Location of Prickly Pear Cays within Anguilla

- Location within Anguilla Location within the Caribbean

Geography
- Location: Atlantic Ocean
- Coordinates: 18°16′00″N 63°11′00″W
- Archipelago: Antilles
- Total islands: Two

Administration
- United Kingdom
- British Overseas Territory: Anguilla

Demographics
- Population: 1 (2020)
- Pop. density: 0/km^{2} (0/sq mi)
- Ethnic groups: None

Additional information
- Time zone: AST (UTC-4)
- ISO code: AI

The Prickly Pear Cays, sometimes spelt as Prickley Pear Cays, are a small pair of uninhabited islands about six miles from Road Bay, Anguilla, in the Leeward Islands of the Caribbean. They are divided by a narrow boat channel between Prickly Pear East and Prickly Pear West. Prickly Pear Cays were classified as 'wildlands' by the "Eastern Caribbean Natural Area Management Programme" (ECNAMP). In addition, Prickly Pear Cays are one of six marine protected areas of Anguilla.

== Geography ==
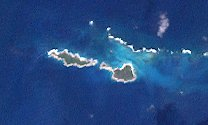
Satellite image of Prickly Pear Cays

Along with Dog, Scrub, Little Scrub, Seal, and Sombrero islets, the Prickly Pear Cays are located on the drowned Anguilla Bank. The cays are characterized by Early Miocene reefal limestone positioned upon Eocene-Oligocene volcanic rocks. These form a section of the active volcanic arc of the Lesser Antilles. The two cays are located close to each other at 18°16′N 63°11′W. They are accessible from Road Bay, Anguilla (6 miles (9.7 km) to its north) and Saint Martin either by catamaran or sail boat. West Cay is longer than East Cay. North Cay, a 2 metres (6 ft 7 in) rock outcrop, is situated north of East Cay. There is also a rock outcrop between Prickly Pear Cays and another cay known as Bush Cay, which is separated by a 0.5 miles (0.80 km) waterway. Another rocky protrusion, known as Flirt Rocks, is situated north of Prickly Pear Cays. Dog Island Channel separates Dog Island from the Prickly Pear Cays.

West Cay is narrow, about 0.75 miles (1.21 km) long and rugged. Its western bay is covered with brush which rises to a height of 25 feet (7.6 m). With rocky coral reefs, it has no easy boat landing facility.

East Cay is about 1 mile (1.6 km) long and 0.25 miles (0.40 km) wide. It has sparse vegetation and a sandy shoreline. The east cay also has salt ponds.

Prickly Pear Cays have been designated as a marine park with permanent moorings. There is total ban on coral extraction or shells from underwater and spear fishing is not allowed. The sea is generally calm. Prickly Pear Reef is an underwater canyon with ledges and caves whose depth varies from 40 feet (12 m) to 70 feet (21 m) and includes an underwater, chimney-like formation.

== Geology ==
The geological formation in both the cays is of laminated calcareous sandstone. The layered stratigraphic formation is inferred to be due to "successive deposits by the tides or overflows from a troubled sea." Over a long period of exposure, these formations have developed a laminated condition with the lamination beds of 25 mm (0.98 in) to 100 mm (3.9 in) thickness. The strata are disturbed in several sections. They have been assessed as suitable for use in pavements in view of their compact formation.

At West Cay, an old quarry near a good harbour was used for exporting sandstone slabs.

== Flora and fauna ==
Along with certain sections of mainland Anguilla, Prickly Pear Cays were classified as 'wildlands' by ECNAMP in 1980. Many types of plants, birds and reptiles have been recorded in both the cays. Uncontrolled grazing by livestock is permitted in all the vegetation areas.

=== Plants ===
Both cays are covered by shrubland. The vegetation is dictated by the thin soil mantle and the presence of limestone cavities. Prickly pear, pope's head cactus and sea grape are the dominant plants. Other common plants are mauby bark, milky thorn, lignum vitae, sage cop, loblolly, nicker tree (only on Prickly Pear East), cockspur and balsam bush.

=== Animals ===
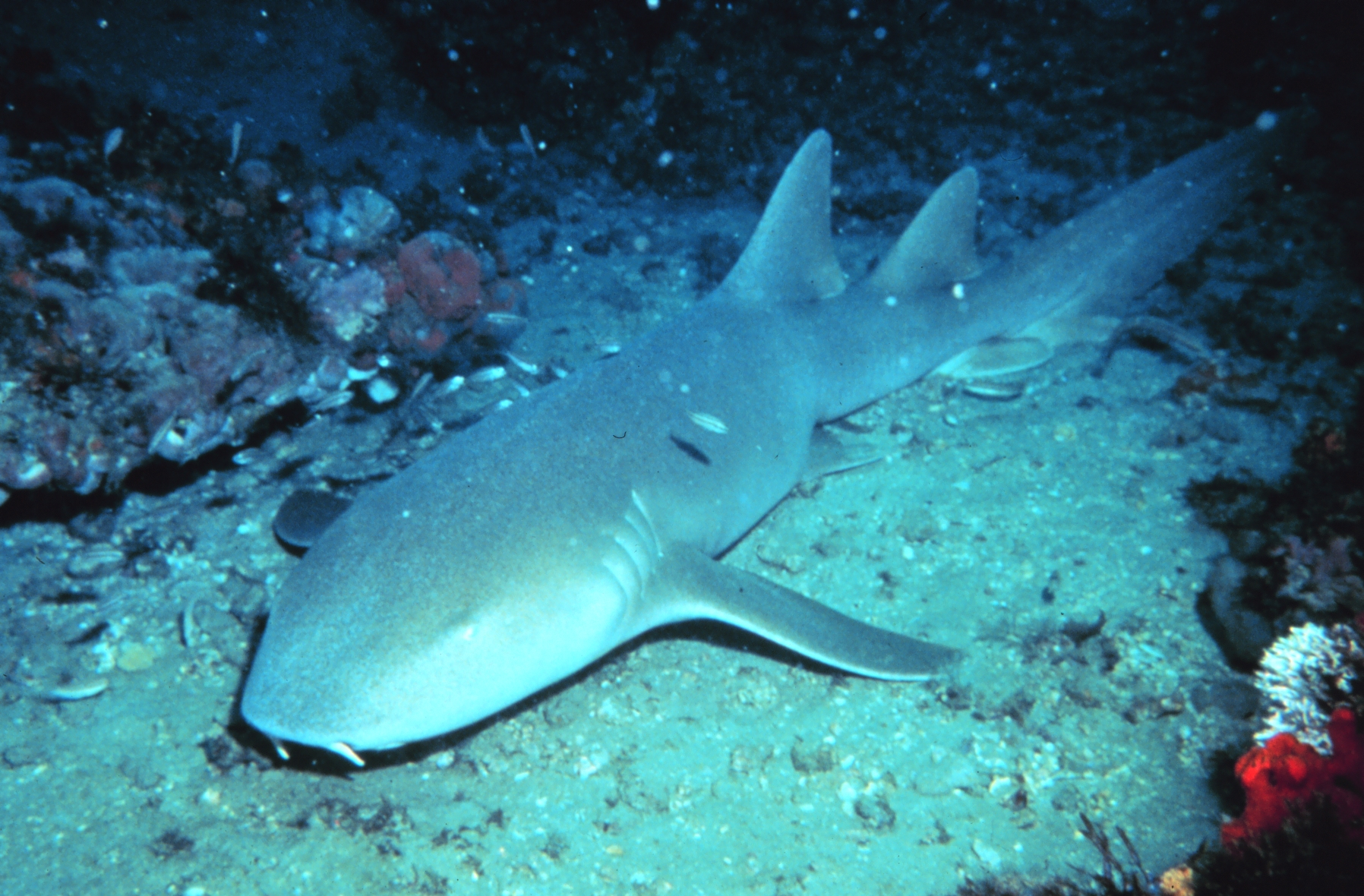
Nurse shark

Nesting birds are a common sight along the rocky coast line. The two cays have been identified as an Important Bird Area by BirdLife International because of their breeding seabirds. These include red-billed tropicbirds, brown pelicans, brown boobies, laughing gulls and least terns. Brown noddies and bridled terns also occur. Resident landbirds include Caribbean elaenias and yellow warblers.

Numerous reptile species, such as Anguilla Bank anole and Anguilla Bank ameiva (on East Cay), are seen. Sea turtles also frequent the shores of the cays.

Marine fauna in the reef area include schooling goatfish, crabs, lobsters, barracuda, angelfish, groupers, squirrelfish, butterflyfish, tarpon, mangrove snapper and grunts. Nurse sharks are also seen resting at the sandy bottom under the ledges of the caverns.

== Tourism ==
The islands are popular with tourists due to the abundant marine and bird life. There are two restaurants and a bar which are serviced by staff who come in each day from the mainland of Anguilla. Thatch roofed structures provide the ambience for the vistas of the turquoise blue seas which attract visitors to the cays. The East Cay has a landing area which requires careful manoeuvring. Snorkelling and diving are possible in the East Cay amidst the coral reefs, with several sunken ships in the area.
