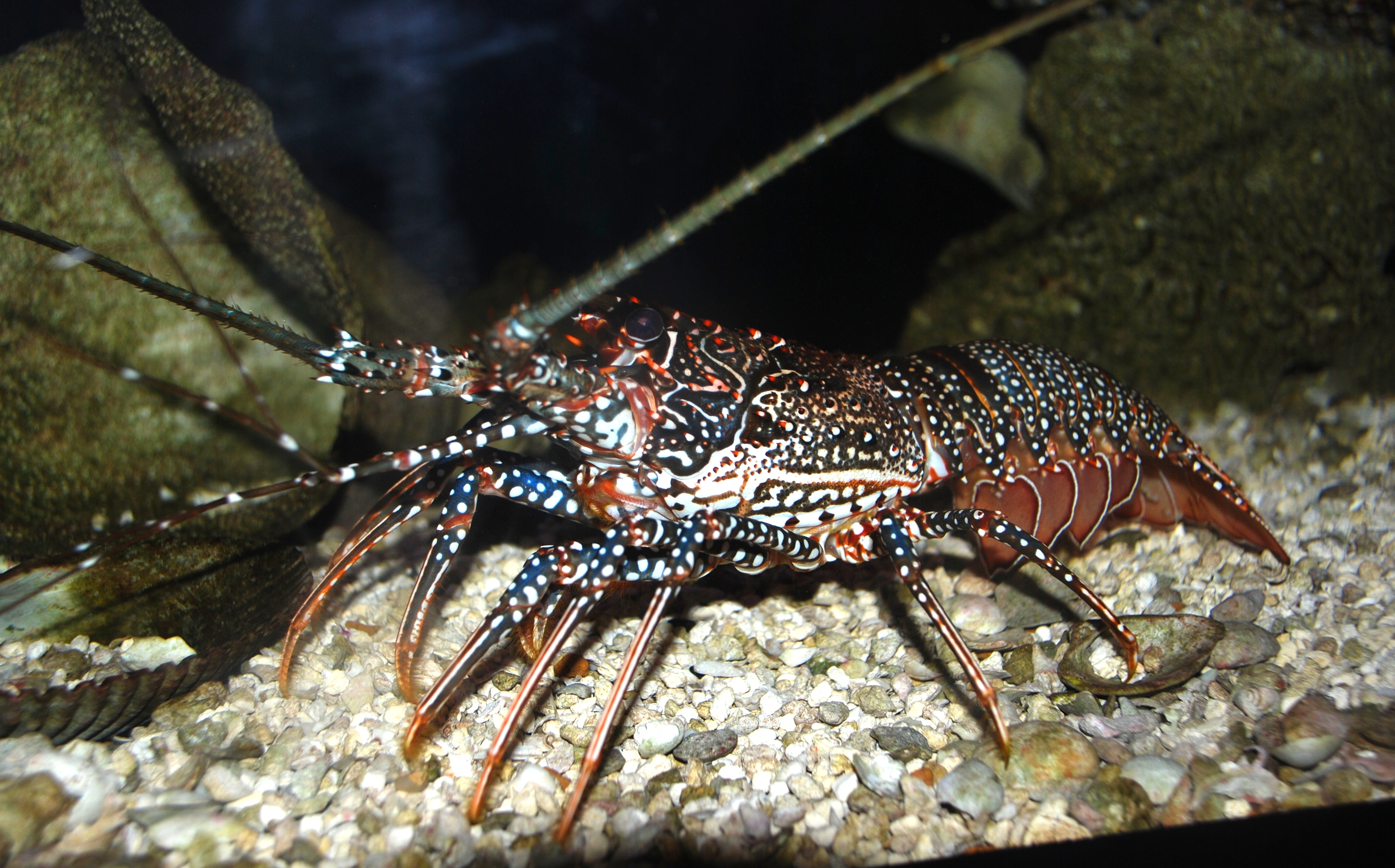

Conservation status
- Least Concern (IUCN 3.1)

Scientific classification
- Kingdom: Animalia
- Phylum: Arthropoda
- Class: Malacostraca
- Order: Decapoda
- Suborder: Pleocyemata
- Family: Palinuridae
- Genus: Panulirus
- Species: P. guttatus

Binomial name
- Panulirus guttatus (Latreille, 1804)

Synonyms
- Palinurus guttatus Latreille, 1804

= Panulirus guttatus =

Species of crustacean

Panulirus guttatus, the spotted spiny lobster or Guinea chick lobster, is a species of spiny lobster that lives on shallow rocky reefs in the tropical West Atlantic and Caribbean Sea.

== Description ==
Panulirus guttatus has a pair of compound eyes on flexible stalks, long thick spiny antennae, six pairs of small appendages around the mouth and five pairs of walking legs which are not tipped by large claws. The antennular plate bears two large, widely separated spines. The maximum length of this spiny lobster is about 20 cm (8 in) but a more normal length is 15 cm (6 in). The body color is purplish-black, heavily marked with conspicuous round white spots. The main leg segments are dark and spotted with white, but the penultimate leg segments have dark, longitudinal stripes on a pale background.

== Distribution and habitat ==
Panulirus guttatus is native to the tropical western Atlantic Ocean and the Caribbean Sea but it also extends into the Gulf of Mexico. Its range extends from Bermuda, the Bahamas, southern Florida and the West Indies, to Curaçao, Bonaire, Los Roques and Suriname. It is found on rocky reefs in shallow water, at depths down to about 23 metres (75 ft), often hiding in crevices or under large coral heads. During the daylight hours they are in the coral reefs and while at nighttime the animals move away from the protective sites to feed on food along the ocean floor.

== Ecology ==
Panulirus guttatus is nocturnal and feeds on bivalve molluscs, gastropod molluscs, crustaceans and chitons which it finds by touch and with chemical cues.

In Bermuda, breeding takes place from May to October, but in the warmer parts of its range, Panulirus guttatus breeds throughout the year. After mating, the female carries the eggs on her abdomen held under her tail. When ready to release the eggs, she migrates to the reef crest and their release is usually followed by moulting. The larvae have a very long developmental period and are planktonic at first, before becoming "pueruli" larvae, a transitional phase between planktonic larvae and benthic juveniles. They settle on the outermost shallow reef edges where there is vigorous water movement.

== Uses ==
There is no specific fishery for this species although it is caught incidentally when targeting other species, either by hand, with a spear or in traps. It is mostly marketed locally and eaten fresh.

== Status ==
Panulirus guttatus is a common species and has a wide range. It is not currently the subject of commercial fishing on any great scale but may become so as the Caribbean spiny lobster (Panulirus argus) populations decline. The International Union for Conservation of Nature has assessed its conservation status as being of "least concern".
