= Dog Island, Anguilla =

Island in Anguilla

Dog Island
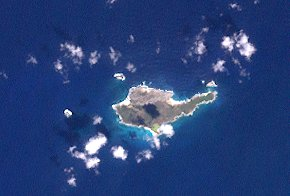
- NASA Landsat 7 picture shows Dog Island, Anguilla.

- Location of Dog Island within Anguilla

- Location within Anguilla Location within the Caribbean

Geography
- Location: Atlantic Ocean
- Coordinates: 18°16′42″N 63°15′12″W
- Archipelago: Antilles
- Area: 207 ha (510 acres)

Administration
- United Kingdom
- British Overseas Territory: Anguilla

Additional information
- Time zone: AST (UTC-4)
- ISO code: AI

Dog Island is an uninhabited small island of 207 ha (510 acres) located approximately 13 km (8.1 mi) to the north-west of Anguilla, a British Overseas Territory in the Caribbean. It is low and rocky, with three small cays off the west and north coasts. The coastline is characterised by low cliffs alternating with sandy beaches. Large ponds lie inside two of the beaches. Dog Island lies west of the Prickley Pear Cays.

== Flora and fauna ==
The central part of the island is covered in thorny scrub with prickly pear. The island, with the adjacent cays, has been identified as an Important Bird Area by BirdLife International because it is home to large numbers of nesting seabirds, mainly sooty terns with over 100,000 pairs recorded. Other seabirds breeding in smaller numbers include red-billed tropicbirds, magnificent frigatebirds, masked and brown boobies, laughing gulls, bridled terns and brown noddies. Reptiles present include the Anguilla Bank ameiva, Anguilla Bank anole, little dwarf gecko, island least gecko and a Mabuya skink. There are also feral goats.

== Dog Island Recovery Project ==
Invasive black rats (Rattus rattus) are a large contributor to seabird extinction, endangerment and population declines worldwide. Rats prey on seabird eggs, nestlings and adults affecting their breeding success. Black rat predation was identified as the most likely cause for declining reptile and seabird populations over a number of years on Dog Island. A feasibility study for rat eradication was conducted in 2007 and the Dog Island Recovery Project began in 2011.

Rat eradication was done through a ground-based poison program using protective bait stations to reduce risk to non-target species, particularly reptiles and feral goats. 1,714 bait stations were placed out on a bait station grid consisting of a series of parallel tracks was cut through the vegetation on Dog Island. Poison used in the bait stations was cereal-based wax blocks containing brodifacoum at 0.005%. The project also included monitoring of native species and biosecurity procedures to prevent reinvasion. This was a multiple-year project and eradication success was confirmed in 2014.

Keeping the Dog Island rat free requires constant vigilance to detect and respond to any rat incursions. Risk of reinvasion by rats is greatest from private vessels, charter boats and fishing boats, especially vessels that moor overnight. Permanent biosecurity stations are maintained on Dog Island and an incursion response plan has been developed.
