= Republic of Anguilla =

1967–1969 unrecognised state in the Caribbean

Coordinates: 18°12′46″N 63°03′07″W

- 1967–1969
- Flag Coat of arms
- Motto: Strength and Endurance
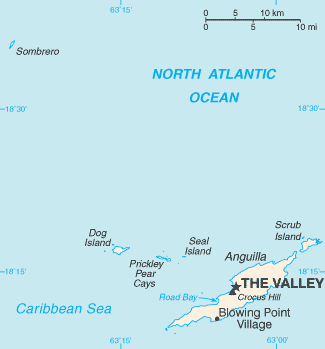
- Status: Unrecognised state
- Capital: The Valley
- Common languages: English
- Government: Republic
- Council Chairman
  - 1967: Peter Adams
  - 1967–1969: Ronald Webster
- Treasurer
  - 1967–1969: Walter Hodge
- Legislature: Island Council
  - Upper house: Senate
  - Lower house: House of Representatives
- History
  - First declaration of independence: 12 July 1967
  - Second declaration of independence: 7 February 1969
  - British occupation: 19 March 1969
  - Interim agreement: July 1971
- Currency: Anguilla Liberty dollar
Preceded by	Succeeded by
Saint Christopher-Nevis-Anguilla	Anguilla; Saint Christopher-Nevis-Anguilla
- Today part of: Anguilla

The Republic of Anguilla was a short-lived, unrecognised independent state on the island of Anguilla. It lasted from 11 July 1967 until 19 March 1969, when British control was re-established.

== Background ==
On 27 February 1967, Britain granted the territory of Saint Christopher-Nevis-Anguilla the status of "associated state", with its own constitution and a considerable degree of self-government. Many Anguillans strenuously objected to the continuing political subservience to Saint Kitts, and on 30 May (known as Anguilla Day), the Saint Kitts police were evicted from the island. The provisional government requested United States administration, which was declined. On 11 July 1967, a referendum on Anguilla's secession from the fledgling state was held. The results were 1,813 votes for secession and 5 against. A declaration of independence (written mainly by Harvard Law professor Roger Fisher) was read publicly by Walter Hodge.

A separate legislative council was immediately established. Peter Adams served as the first Chairman of the Anguilla Island Council, but when he agreed to take Anguilla back to St. Kitts, he was deposed and replaced by Ronald Webster. In December 1967, two members of Britain's Parliament worked out an interim agreement by which for one year a British official would exercise basic administrative authority along with the Anguilla Council. Tony Lee took the position on 8 January 1968, but by the end of the term, no agreement had been reached on the long-term future of the island's governance.

== Declaration of republic ==
On 6 February 1969, Anguilla held a second referendum resulting in a vote of 1,739 to 4 against returning to association with Saint Kitts. The next day Anguilla declared itself an independent republic.

Webster once again served as Chairman. A new British envoy, William Whitlock, arrived on 11 March 1969 with a proposal for a new interim British administration. He was quickly expelled at gunpoint.

== Restoration of British control ==
On 19 March 1969, Operation Sheepskin began, which included a contingent of 331 2nd Battalion, The Parachute Regiment, plus 30 London Metropolitan Police landed by helicopter on the island from two frigates, ostensibly to "restore order". Webster fled the island, eventually addressing the General Assembly of the United Nations, arguing that Anguilla should have the right to self-determination.

Tony Lee was dismissed, while Lord Caradon and Webster drew up a Seven Point Declaration. Effectively, Anguilla was allowed to secede from Saint Kitts and Nevis, although it was not until 19 December 1980 that Anguilla formally disassociated itself from Saint Kitts and became a separate British dependency. While Saint Kitts and Nevis went on to gain full independence from the UK in 1983, Anguilla remains a British overseas territory.
