= Anguilla =

British Overseas Territory in the Leeward Islands

- British Overseas Territory
- Flag Coat of arms
- Motto: "Unity, Strength and Endurance"
- Anthem: "God Save the King" (Note: "God Save the King" is the national anthem by custom, not statute, and there is no authorised version. Typically only the first verse is usually sung, although the second verse is also often sung as well at state and public events. The words King, he, him, his, used at present, are replaced by Queen, she, her when the monarch is female.)
- Territorial anthem: "God Bless Anguilla"
- Location of Anguilla (red)

- Sovereignty: United Kingdom
- English control: 1667
- Federation with Saint Kitts and Nevis: 1871
- Secession and independence: 12 July 1967
- British control restored: 18 March 1969
- Formal secession from Saint Kitts and Nevis: 16 December 1980
- Capital and largest city: The Valley; 18°13′15″N 63°03′06″W
- Official languages: English
- Ethnic groups (2011): 85.3% African; 4.9% Hispanic; 3.8% Mixed; 3.2% White; 1.0% Indian; 1.9% Other; 0.3% No answer
- Demonym(s): Anguillian

Government
  - Monarch: Charles III
  - Governor: Julia Crouch
  - Deputy Governor: Perin A. Bradley
  - Premier: Cora Richardson-Hodge
- Legislature: House of Assembly

Government of the United Kingdom
  - Minister: Uma Kumaran

Area
  - Total: 91 km^{2} (35 sq mi)
  - Water (%): negligible
- Highest elevation: 73 m (240 ft)

Population
  - 2024 estimate: 16,010 (not ranked)
  - 2011 census: 13,452
  - Density: 132/km^{2} (341.9/sq mi) (not ranked)
- GDP (PPP): 2014 estimate
  - Total: $311 million
  - Per capita: $29,493
- GDP (nominal): 2024 estimate
  - Total: EC$1.386 billion (US$513 million)
  - Per capita: EC$86,577 (US$32,065)
- Currency: Eastern Caribbean dollar (XCD)
- Time zone: UTC−04:00 (AST)
- Date format: dd/mm/yyyy
- Driving side: Left
- Calling code: +1
- UK postcode: AI-2640
- ISO 3166 code: AI
- Internet TLD: .ai
- Website: gov.ai

Anguilla (Note: /æŋˈɡwɪlə/ ang-GWIL-ə) is a British Overseas Territory of the Caribbean region in the North Atlantic Ocean. It is one of the most northerly of the Leeward Islands in the Lesser Antilles, lying east of Puerto Rico and the Virgin Islands and directly north of Saint Martin. The territory consists of the main island of Anguilla, approximately 16 miles (26 kilometres) long by 3 miles (5 km) wide at its widest point, together with a number of much smaller islands and cays with no permanent population. The territory's capital is The Valley. The total land area of the territory is 35 square miles (91 km^{2}), with a population of approximately 15,753 in 2021.

== Etymology ==
The Indigenous Arawakan name for the island was Malliouhana.

In reference to the island's shape, the Italian anguilla, meaning "eel" (in turn, from the Latin diminutive of anguis, "snake") was used as its name. Anguillan tradition holds that Christopher Columbus named the island.

== History ==
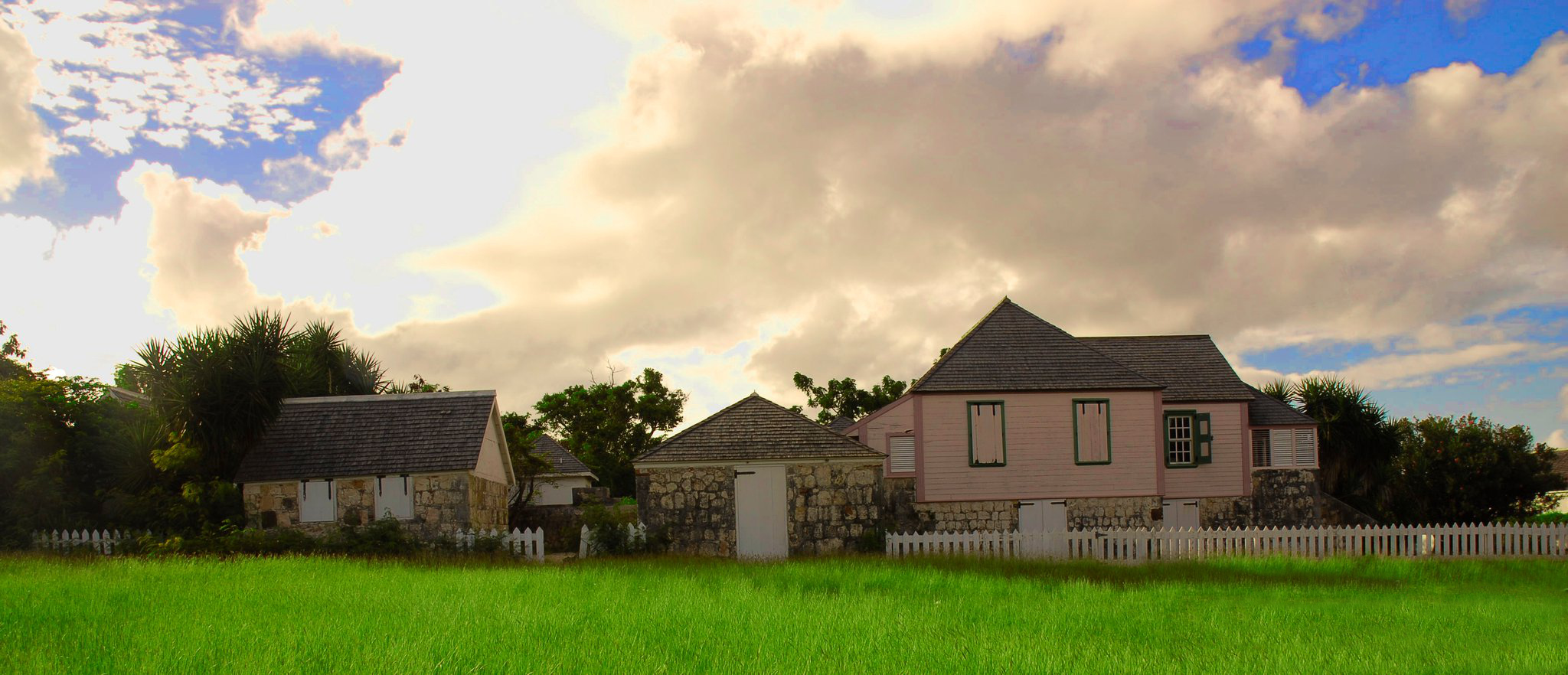
Wallblake House, a plantation house thought to be the oldest building in Anguilla

Anguilla was first settled by Indigenous American peoples who migrated from South America. The earliest Native American artefacts found on Anguilla have been dated to around 1300 BC; remains of settlements date from AD 600. There are two known petroglyph sites in Anguilla: Big Spring and Fountain Cavern. The rock ledges of Big Spring contain more than 100 petroglyphs (dating back to AD 600–1200), the majority consisting of three indentations that form faces.

Precisely when Anguilla was first seen by Europeans is uncertain. Some sources claim that Columbus sighted the island during his second voyage in 1493, while others state that the first European explorer was the French Huguenot nobleman and merchant René Goulaine de Laudonnière in 1564. The Dutch West India Company established a fort on the island in 1631, but the Company withdrew after the fort was destroyed by the Spanish in 1633.

Traditional accounts state that Anguilla was first colonised by English settlers from Saint Kitts, beginning in 1650. The settlers focused on planting tobacco and, to a lesser extent, cotton. The French temporarily took over the island in 1666, but returned it to English control in the next year, under the terms of the Treaty of Breda. Major John Scott, who visited in September 1667, wrote of leaving the island "in good condition" and noted that, in July 1668, "200 or 300 people fled thither in time of war". The French attacked again in 1688, 1745 and 1796, causing much destruction but failing to capture the island.

It is likely that the early European settlers brought enslaved Africans with them. Historians confirm that African slaves lived in the region in the early 17th century, with slaves from Senegal living on St Kitts by the mid 17th century. By 1672, a slave depot existed on the island of Nevis, serving the Leeward Islands. While the time of African arrival in Anguilla is difficult to place precisely, archival evidence indicates a substantial African presence of at least 100 enslaved people by 1683. They seem to have come from Central Africa as well as West Africa. The slaves were forced to work on plantations growing sugar, which had begun to replace tobacco as Anguilla's main crop. Over time, the African slaves and their descendants came to vastly outnumber the white settlers. In 1807, the African slave trade was terminated within the British Empire, and slavery was outlawed completely in 1834. Many planters subsequently sold up or left the island.

During the early colonial period, Anguilla was administered by the British through Antigua but, in 1825, it was placed under the administrative control of nearby Saint Kitts. Anguilla was federated with St Kitts and Nevis in 1882, against the wishes of many Anguillans. Economic stagnation, the severe effects of several droughts in the 1890s, and then the Great Depression of the 1930s, led many Anguillans to emigrate for better prospects elsewhere.

=== Anguillan Revolution ===
Flag of the short-lived Republic of Anguilla (c. 1967-1969)

In 1952, full adult suffrage was introduced to Anguilla. After a brief period as part of the West Indies Federation from 1958 to 1962, the island of Anguilla became part of the associated state of Saint Kitts-Nevis-Anguilla, which was granted full internal autonomy in 1967. Many Anguillans had no wish to be a part of that union, however, resenting the dominance of St Kitts within it.

On 30 May 1967, Anguillans forcibly ejected the St Kitts police force from the island and, following a referendum, declared their independence from St Kitts.

The events, led by Atlin Harrigan and Ronald Webster, among others, became known as the Anguillan Revolution. Its goal was not independence per se, but rather to gain separation from Saint Kitts and Nevis and a return to being a British colony.

With negotiations failing to break the deadlock, a second referendum was held, which confirmed the desire for separation from St Kitts, and the Republic of Anguilla was declared unilaterally, with Ronald Webster as president. Efforts by British envoy, William Whitlock, failed to break the impasse.

In March 1969, 300 British troops were sent to the island. British authority was restored, and confirmed by the Anguilla Act 1971 (c. 63) of July 1971.

In 1980, Anguilla was allowed to formally secede from Saint Kitts and Nevis and become a separate British Crown colony (now a British overseas territory). Since then, Anguilla has been politically stable, and has had considerable growth in its tourism and offshore financing sectors.

== Geography and geology ==
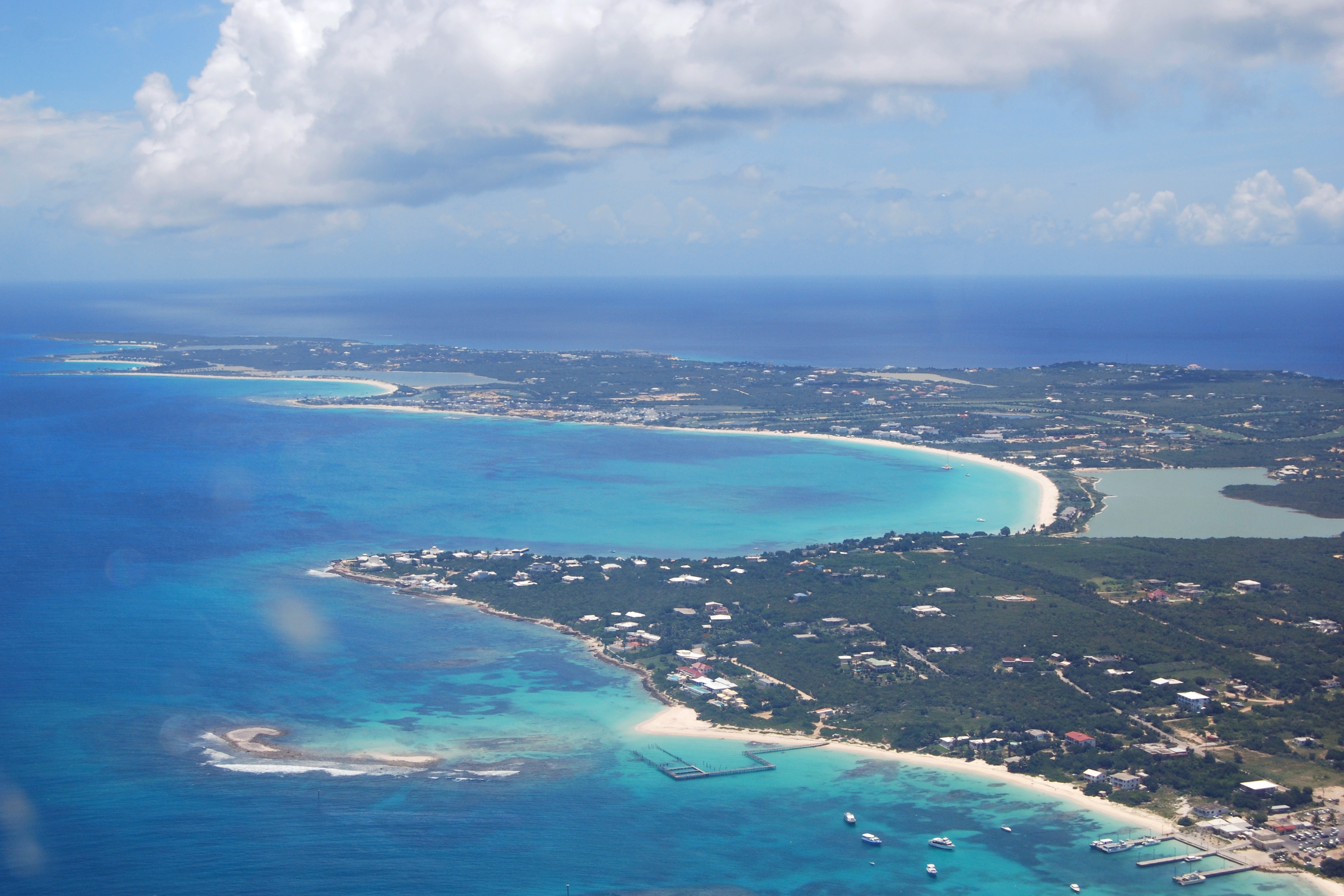
An aerial view of the western portion of the island of Anguilla. The Blowing Point ferry terminal is visible in the lower right, as are (right to left) Shaddick Point, Rendezvous Bay, Cove Bay and Maundays Bay.

Anguilla is a flat, low-lying island of coral and limestone in the Caribbean Sea, measuring some 16 miles (26 km) long and 3.5 miles (6 km) in width. It lies to the east of Puerto Rico and the Virgin Islands and directly north of Saint Martin, separated from that island by the Anguilla Channel. The soil is generally thin and poor, supporting scrub, tropical and forest vegetation. The terrain is generally low-lying, with the highest terrain located in the vicinity of The Valley; Crocus Hill, Anguilla's highest peak at 240 feet (73 m), lies in the western regions of the town.

Anguilla is noted for its ecologically important coral reefs and beaches. Apart from the main island of Anguilla itself, the territory includes a number of other smaller islands and cays, mostly tiny and uninhabited:

- Anguillita
- Blowing Rock
- Dog Island
- Little Scrub Island
- Prickly Pear Cays
- Scrub Island
- Seal Island
- Sombrero, also known as Hat Island
- Sandy Island
- Scilly Cay

In Anguilla, forest cover is around 61% of the total land area, equivalent to 5,500 hectares (ha) of forest in 2020, which was unchanged from 1990.

=== Geology ===
Anguilla (and the wider Anguilla Bank) is of volcanic origin, lying on the Lesser Antilles volcanic island arc, and tuffs and volcaniclastic breccias of Eocene age are exposed locally on the island. The island was largely submerged during the Miocene, leading to the formation of the reefal limestone Anguilla Formation, which was subsequently tectonically uplifted and covers most of the island today. Since the late Pleistocene, however, Anguilla has undergone tectonic subsidence at a rate of around 1–2 mm/yr.

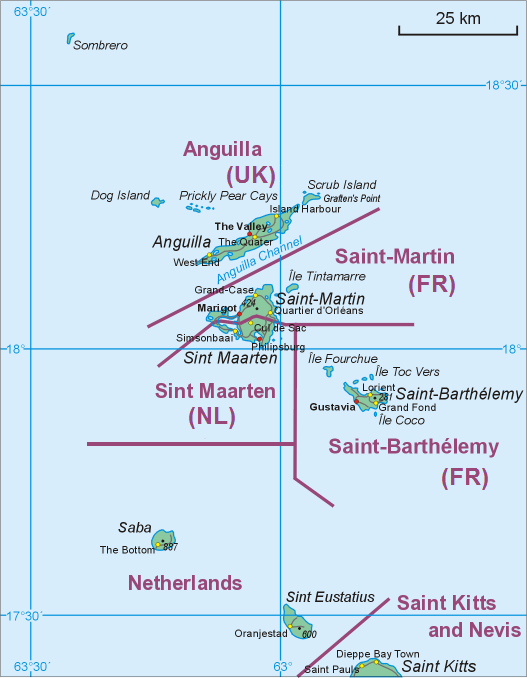
Map showing the location of Anguilla relative to Sint Maarten/Saint Martin and other islands to its south

Map of Anguilla

=== Climate ===
==== Temperature ====
Northeastern trade winds keep this tropical island relatively cool and dry. Average annual temperature is 80 °F (27 °C). July–October is its hottest period, December–February, its coolest.

==== Rainfall ====
Rainfall averages 35 inches (890 mm) annually, although the figures vary from season to season and year to year. The island is subject to both sudden tropical storms and hurricanes, which occur in the period from July to November. The island suffered damage from Hurricane Luis in 1995, severe flooding 5 to 20 feet (1.5 to 6 metres) from Hurricane Lenny in 1999 and severe damage from Hurricane Irma in 2017, which remains the most powerful hurricane to hit the island.

== Governance ==
=== Political system ===
Anguilla is an internally self-governing overseas territory of the United Kingdom. Its politics take place in a framework of a parliamentary representative democratic dependency, whereby the Premier is the head of government, and of a pluriform multi-party system. A governor is appointed by the British government to represent the King.

The United Nations Committee on Decolonization includes Anguilla on the United Nations list of non-self-governing territories. The territory's constitution is the Anguilla Constitutional Order 1 April 1982 (amended 1990). Executive power is exercised by the government, with legislative power being vested in both the government and the House of Assembly. The judiciary is independent of the executive and the legislature.

=== Defence ===
As a British overseas territory, the UK is responsible for Anguilla's military defence, although there are no active garrisons or armed forces present in the territory. Since 2020, the Royal Navy has often forward-deployed a River-class offshore patrol vessel long-term to the Caribbean for patrol and sovereignty protection duties. In October 2023, the destroyer HMS Dauntless (which had temporarily replaced the River-class patrol vessel HMS Medway on her normal Caribbean tasking), visited the territory in order to assist local authorities in preparing for the climax of the hurricane season.

== Population ==
=== Demographics ===
The majority of residents (90.08%) are of West African ancestry, most of whom are the descendants of enslaved people transported from Africa. Minorities include whites at 3.74% and people of mixed race at 4.65% (figures from 2001 census). Of the population, 72% is Anguillan while 28% is non-Anguillan (2001 census). Of the non-Anguillan population, many are citizens of the United States, United Kingdom, St Kitts & Nevis, the Dominican Republic, and Jamaica.

The years 2006 and 2007 saw an influx of large numbers of Chinese, Indian and Mexican workers, brought in as labour for major tourist developments due to the local population not being large enough to support the labour requirements.

=== Religion ===
Christian churches did not have a consistent or strong presence during the initial period of English colonisation; spiritual and religious practices of Europeans and Africans tended to reflect their regional origins. As early as 1813, Christian ministers formally ministered to enslaved Africans and promoted literacy among converts. The Wesleyan (Methodist) Missionary Society of England built churches and schools from 1817.

According to the 2001 census, Christianity is Anguilla's predominant religion, with 29% of the population practising Anglicanism; another 23.9% are Methodist. Other churches on the island include Seventh-day Adventist, Baptist, Roman Catholic (served by the Diocese of Saint John's–Basseterre, with the See at Saint John on Antigua and Barbuda) and a small community of Jehovah's Witnesses (0.7%). Between 1992 and 2001, membership in the Church of God and Pentecostal churches increased. There are at least 15 churches on the island. Although a minority on the island, Anguilla is an important location to followers of Rastafarian religion as the birthplace of Robert Athlyi Rogers, author of the Holy Piby which had a strong influence on Rastafarian and other Africa-centre belief systems. More recently, a Muslim cultural centre has opened on the island.

Religions in Anguilla by percentage
Religion	1992	2001	2011
Anglican	40.4	29.0	22.7
Methodist	33.2	23.9	19.4
Pentecostal	–	7.7	10.5
Seventh-day Adventist	7.0	7.6	8.3
Baptist	4.7	7.3	7.1
Catholic	3.2	5.7	6.8
Church of God	–	7.6	4.9
Jehovah's Witnesses	–	0.7	1.1
Rastafarian	–	0.7	
Evangelical	–	0.5	
Plymouth Brethren	–	0.3	0.1
Muslim	–	0.3	
Presbyterian	–	0.2	0.2
Hindu	–	0.4	
Jewish	–	0.1	
None	–	4.0	4.5
Other	10.7	3.5	
Not stated	0.7	0.3	

=== Languages ===
Today most people in Anguilla speak a British-influenced variety of standard English. Other languages are also spoken on the island, including varieties of Spanish, Chinese and the languages of other immigrant communities. However, the most common language other than Standard English is the island's own English-lexifier Creole language (not to be confused with Antillean Creole ('French Creole'), spoken in French islands such as Martinique and Guadeloupe). It is referred to locally by terms such as "dialect" (pronounced "dialek"), Anguilla Talk or "Anguillian". It has its main roots in early varieties of English and West African languages, and is similar to the dialects spoken in English-speaking islands throughout the Eastern Caribbean in terms of its structural features.

Linguists who are interested in the origins of Anguillan and other Caribbean Creoles point out that some of its grammatical features can be traced to African languages while others can be traced to European languages. Three areas have been identified as significant for the identification of the linguistic origins of those forced migrants who arrived before 1710: the Gold Coast, the Slave Coast and the Windward Coast.

Sociohistorical information from Anguilla's archives suggests that Africans and Europeans formed two distinct, but perhaps overlapping speech communities in the early phases of the island's colonisation. "Anguillian" is believed to have emerged as the language of the masses as time passed, slavery was abolished and locals began to see themselves as "belonging" to Anguillan society.

== Education ==
There are six government primary schools, one government secondary school (Albena Lake Hodge Comprehensive School), and two private schools. There is a single library, the Edison L. Hughes Education & Library Complex of the Anguilla Public Library. A branch of the Saint James School of Medicine was established in 2011 in Anguilla. It is a private, for-profit medical school headquartered in Park Ridge, Illinois.

New Anglia University is a higher education institution in Anguilla offering premedical and Doctor of Medicine (MD) programmes.

There is a University of the West Indies Open campus site on the island.

== Culture ==
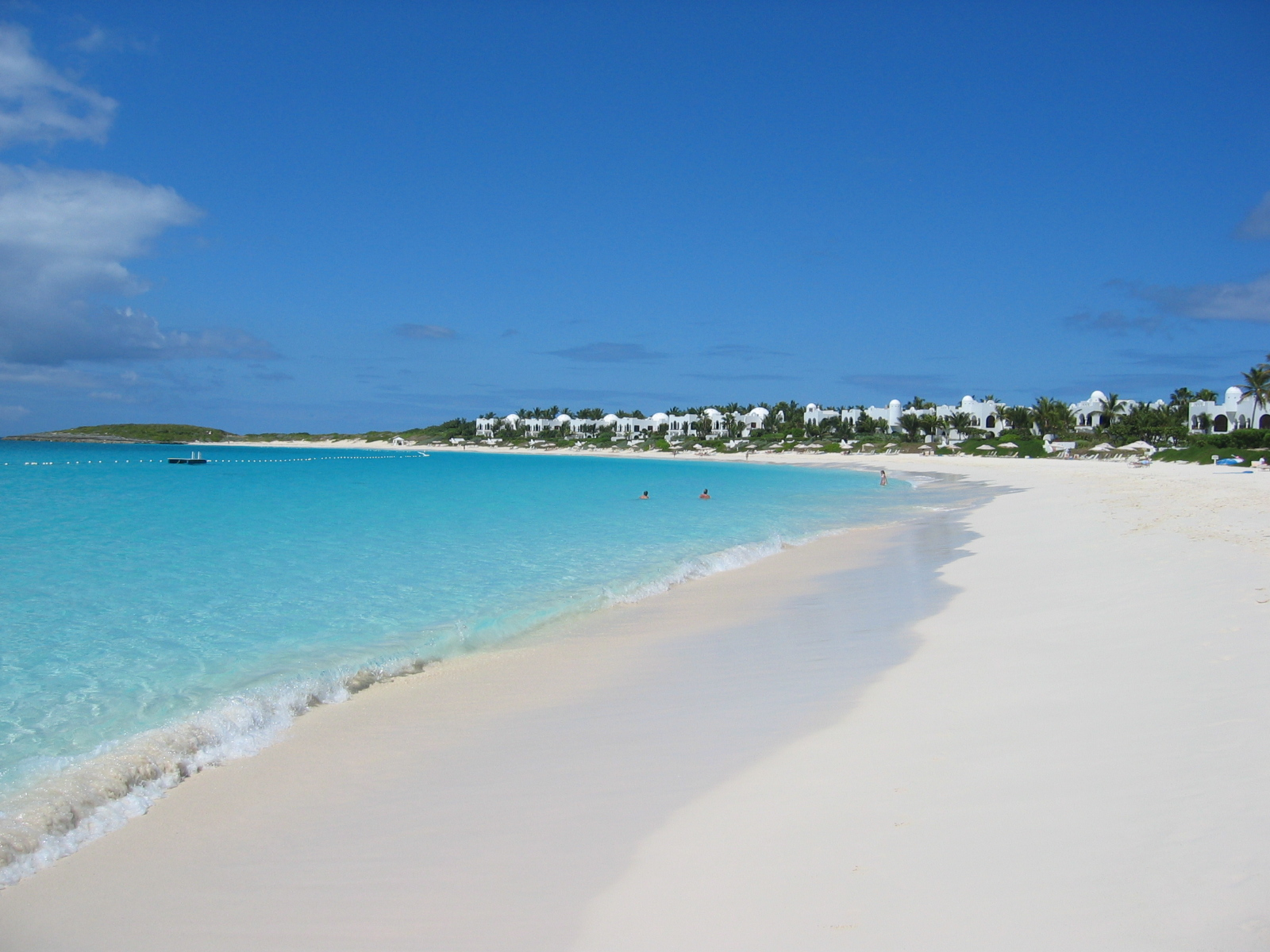
The beach at the Cap Juluca resort on Maundays Bay

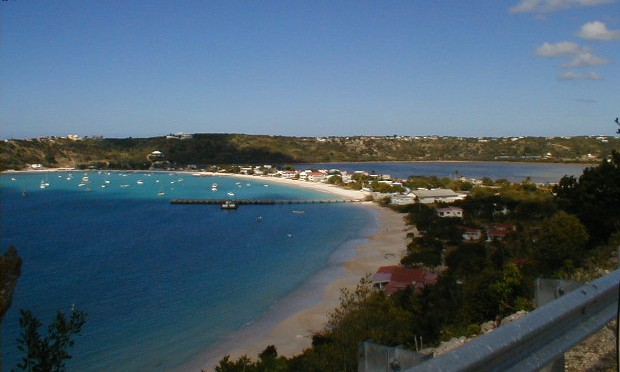
Sandy Ground beach

The island's cultural history begins with the native Taino, Arawak and Carib. Their artefacts have been found around the island, telling of life before European settlers arrived.

Anguillan culture has also been built through immigration. Many European families have moved to the island and have affected the formalities of the Anguillan people.

Similar to nearby islands, Anguilla's geography and location require a cultural reliance on the ocean. The island's abundance of sea life has led to the incorporation of many fish and crustaceans into daily life. They have become a part of the local cuisine, opened up opportunities for ecotourism, and introduced celebrations such as Lobster Fest and boat races.

As throughout the Caribbean, holidays are a cultural fixture. Anguilla's most important holidays are of historic as much as cultural importance – particularly the anniversary of the emancipation (previously August Monday in the Park), celebrated as the Summer Festival, or Carnival, the sailboat races, and Lobster Fest. British festivities, such as the King's Birthday, are also celebrated.

Music in Anguilla presents itself as an important part of its culture as well. All different genres of music are played at the celebrations mentioned above. This music represents the deep history of talent that Anguillans have displayed for decades.

The Anguilla National Trust (ANT) was established in 1989 and opened its current office in 1991 charged with the responsibility of preserving the heritage of the island, including its cultural heritage.

The Heritage Collection Museum used to showcase the history and artefacts of Anguilla, but in 2024 the collection was handed over to the Anguilla National Museum.

=== Cuisine ===
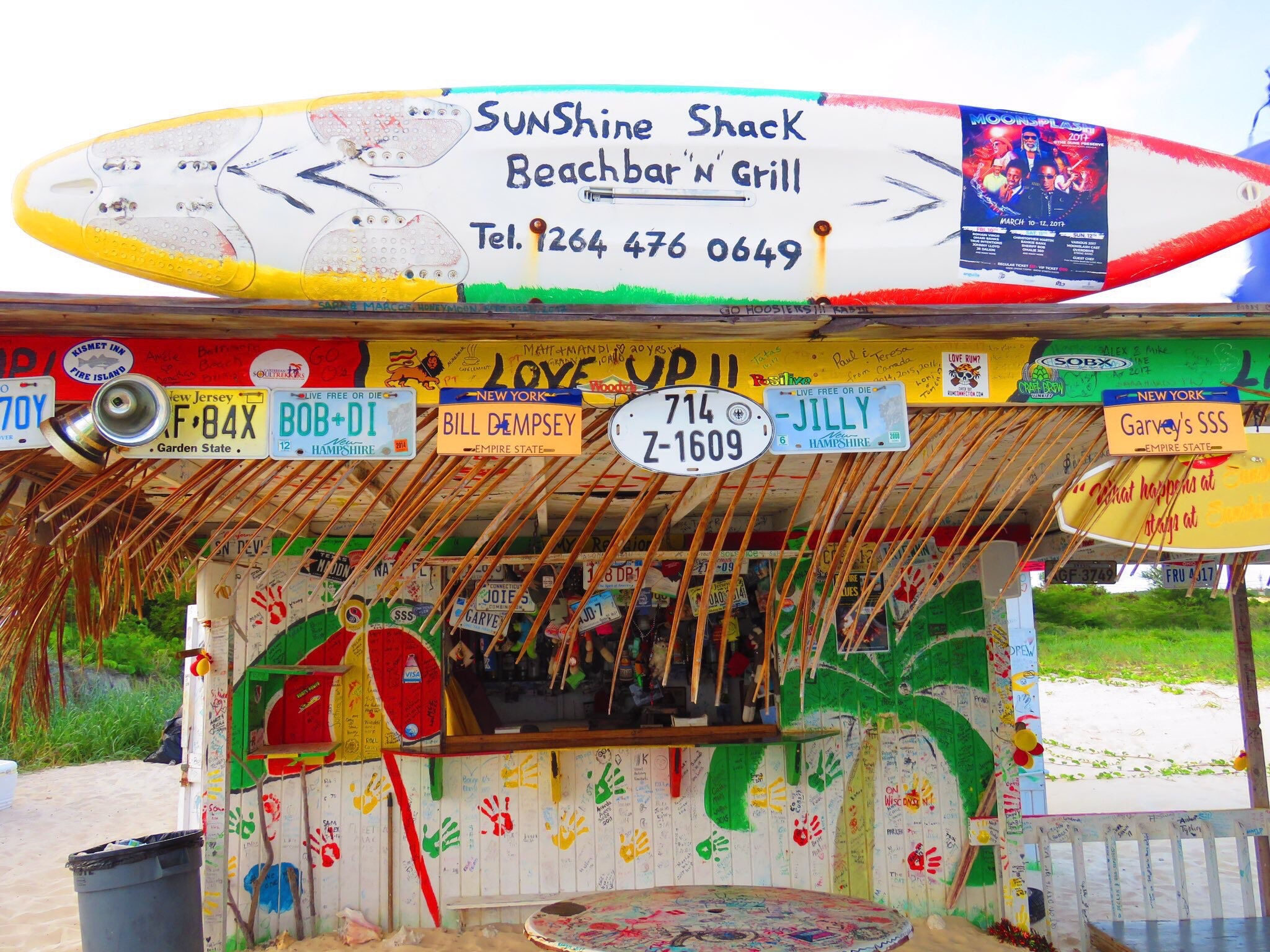
Sunshine Shack Beachbar N Grill located in Rendezvous Bay

Anguillan cuisine is influenced by native Caribbean, West African, Spanish, French, and English cuisines. Seafood is abundant, including prawns, shrimp, crab, spiny lobster, conch, mahi-mahi, red snapper, marlin, and grouper. Salt cod is a staple food eaten on its own and used in stews, casseroles and soups. Livestock is limited due to the small size of the island and people there use poultry, pork, goat, and mutton, along with imported beef. Goat is the most commonly eaten meat, used in a variety of dishes. The official national food of Anguilla is pigeon peas and rice.

A significant amount of the island's produce is imported due to limited land suitable for agriculture production; much of the soil is sandy and infertile. The agricultural produce of Anguilla includes tomatoes, peppers, limes and other citrus fruits, onion, garlic, squash, pigeon peas, and callaloo. Starch staple foods include imported rice and other foods that are imported or locally grown, including yams, sweet potatoes and breadfruit.

Anguilla celebrates its cuisine at annual island-wide and village festivals including Festival del Mar over Easter weekend, Anguilla Culinary Experience in May and Welches Festival around Anguilla's Whit Monday.

=== Literature ===
The Anguilla National Trust has programmes encouraging Anguillan writers and the preservation of the island's history. In 2015, Where I See The Sun – Contemporary Poetry in Anguilla A New Anthology by Lasana M. Sekou was published by House of Nehesi Publishers. Among the forty three poets in the collection are Rita Celestine-Carty, Bankie Banx, John T. Harrigan, Patricia J. Adams, Fabian Fahie, Dr. Oluwakemi Linda Banks, and Reuel Ben Lewi.

=== Music ===
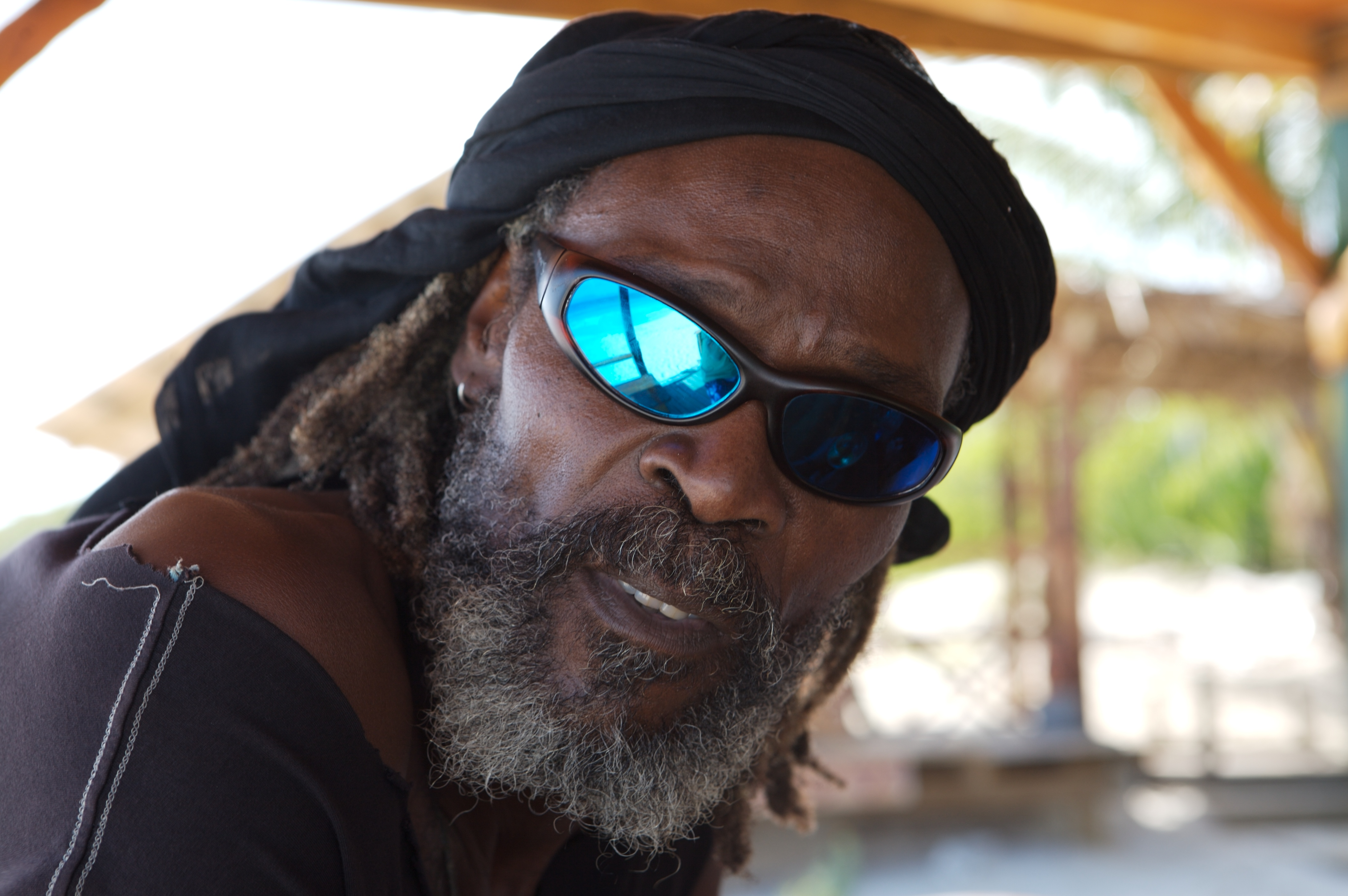
Bankie Banx, noted reggae artist and poet from Anguilla who has built up an international following

Various Caribbean musical genres are popular on the island, such as soca and calypso, but reggae most deeply roots itself in Anguillan society. Anguilla has produced many artists and groups in this genre.

Reggae has shown itself to be the most popular genre in Anguilla. The most successful of reggae artists originating in Anguilla come from the Banks family. Bankie "Banx" and his son Omari Banks have had many chart-topping songs listened to around the world. The two musicians continue to provide live performances across the island quite often.

British Dependency has also gained popularity throughout the 21st century. The band, who began in Anguilla, boasts the island's first female bass player. Performing alongside The Wailers on tour, British Dependency have earned attention from an American audience.

One of many musical events that take place in Anguilla is Moonsplash. Moonsplash is an annual reggae music festival that has occurred in Anguilla for 33 consecutive years and proves to be the oldest independent musical event in the Caribbean. Along with its longstanding history, it is the largest festival annually alongside carnival.

While not many soca and calypso artists have gained extreme popularity, the genres are still widely listened to across the island.

=== Sports ===
Boat racing has deep roots in Anguillan culture and is the national sport. There are regular sailing regattas on national holidays, such as Carnival, which are contested by locally built and designed boats. These boats have names and have sponsors that print their logo on their sails.

As in many other former British colonies, cricket is also a popular sport. Anguilla is the home of Omari Banks, who played for the West Indies Cricket Team, while Cardigan Connor played first-class cricket for English county side Hampshire and was 'chef de mission' (team manager) for Anguilla's Commonwealth Games team in 2002. Other noted players include Chesney Hughes, who played for Derbyshire County Cricket Club in England.

Rugby union is represented in Anguilla by the Anguilla Eels RFC, who were formed in April 2006. The Eels have been finalists in the St. Martin tournament in November 2006 and semi-finalists in 2007, 2008, 2009 and Champions in 2010. The Eels were formed in 2006 by Scottish club national second row Martin Welsh, Club Sponsor and President of the AERFC Ms. Jacquie Ruan, and Canadian standout Scrumhalf Mark Harris (Toronto Scottish RFC).

Anguilla is the birthplace of sprinter Zharnel Hughes who has represented Great Britain since 2015, and England at the 2018 Commonwealth Games. He won the 100 metres at the 2018 European Athletics Championships, the 4 x 100 metres at the same championships, and the 4 x 100 metres for England at the 2018 Commonwealth Games. He also won a 4 × 100 m relay team gold at the 2022 Birmingham Commonwealth Games and a bronze on the 4 × 100 m relay for Great Britain at the 2024 Olympic Games. In 2023 he broke the British record for the 100m sprint, with a time of 9.83 seconds.

Shara Proctor, British Long Jump Silver Medalist at the World Championships in Beijing, first represented Anguilla in the event until 2010 when she began to represent Great Britain and England. Under the Anguillan flag she achieved several medals in the NACAC games.

Keith Connor, triple jumper, is also an Anguillan. He represented Great Britain and England and achieved several international titles including Commonwealth and European Games gold medals and an Olympic bronze medal. Connor later became Head Coach of Australia Athletics.

== Natural history ==
=== Wildlife ===
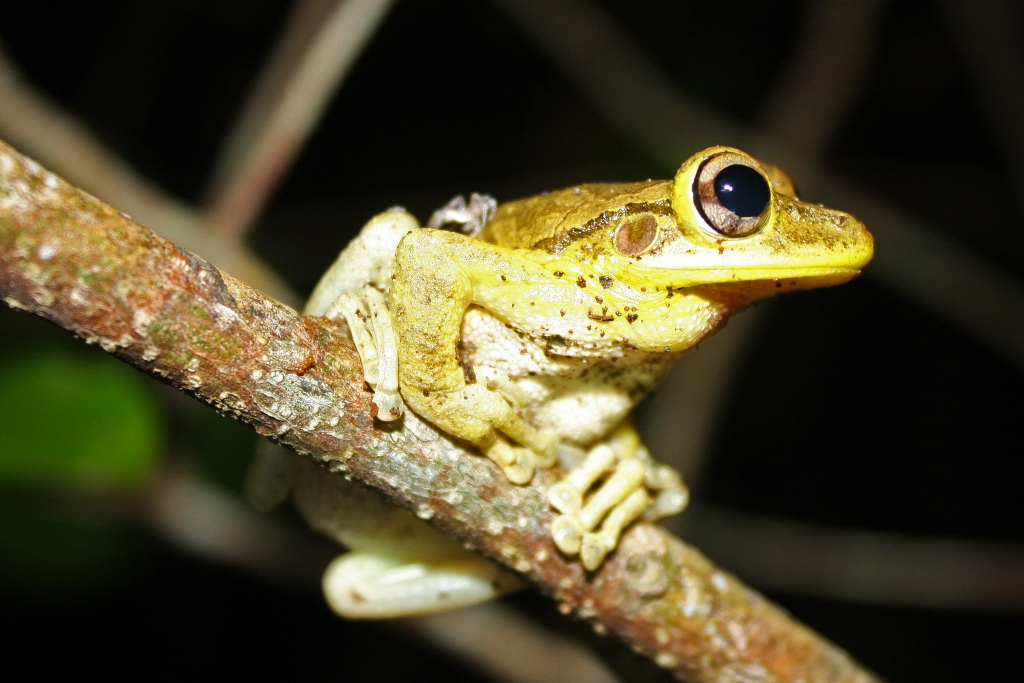
The Cuban tree frog can be found on the island.

Anguilla has habitat for the Cuban tree frogs (Osteopilus septentrionalis). The red-footed tortoise (Chelonoidis carbonaria) is a species of tortoise found here, which originally came from South America. Hurricanes in the mid-90s led to over-water dispersal of the green iguanas (Iguana iguana) to Anguilla. All three animals are introductions.

Five species of bats are known in the literature from Anguilla – the threatened insular single leaf bat (Monophyllus plethodon), the Antillean fruit-eating bat (Brachyphylla cavernarum), the Jamaican fruit bat (Artibeus jamaicensis), the Mexican funnel-eared bat (Natalus stramineus), and the velvety free-tailed bat (Molossus molossus).

== Notable people ==
- Zharnel Hughes (born 1995), sprinter
- Dee-Ann Kentish-Rogers (born 1993), politician, model and Miss Universe Great Britain 2018
- Carlos Newton (born 1976), former UFC Welterweight Champion
- Shara Proctor (born 1988), long jump athlete
- Josette Patricia Simon, OBE (born 1959/1960), actress

== Economy ==
Anguilla's thin arid soil being largely unsuitable for agriculture, the island has few land-based natural resources. Its main industries are tourism, offshore incorporation and management, offshore banking, captive insurance and fishing.

Anguilla's currency is the East Caribbean dollar, though the US dollar is also widely accepted. The exchange rate is fixed to the US dollar at US$1 = EC$2.70.

The economy, and especially the tourism sector, suffered a setback in late 1995 due to the effects of Hurricane Luis in September. Hotels were hit particularly hard but a recovery occurred the following year. Another economic setback occurred during the aftermath of Hurricane Lenny in 2000. Before the 2008 worldwide crisis, the economy of Anguilla was growing strongly, especially the tourism sector, which was driving major new developments in partnerships with multi-national companies. Anguilla's tourism industry received a major boost when it was selected to host the World Travel Awards in December 2014. Known as "the Oscars of the travel industry", the awards ceremony was held at the CuisinArt Resort and Spa and was hosted by Vivica A. Fox. Anguilla was voted the World's Leading Luxury Island Destination from a short list of top-tier candidates such as St. Barts, the Maldives, and Mauritius. The economy, including the tourism sector, suffered its biggest setback in late 2017 due to the effects of Hurricane Irma in September, which was the most powerful hurricane to hit the island and which caused major material damage of $320 million. A lot of infrastructure was damaged, which was repaired in 2018/19 and the economy began to recover in 2019. However, the onset of the COVID-19 pandemic in 2020/21, caused a setback in the economy.

Anguilla's financial system comprises seven banks, two money services businesses, more than 40 company managers, more than 50 insurers, 12 brokers, more than 250 captive intermediaries, more than 50 mutual funds, and eight trust companies.

Anguilla has become a popular tax haven, having no capital gains, estate, profit, sales, or corporate taxes. In April 2011, faced with a mounting deficit, it introduced a 3% "Interim Stabilisation Levy", Anguilla's first form of income tax. Anguilla also has a 0.75% property tax.

Anguilla aims to obtain 15% of its energy from solar power to become less reliant on expensive imported diesel. The Climate & Development Knowledge Network is helping the government gather the information it needs to change the territory's legislation, so that it can integrate renewables into its grid. Barbados has also made good progress in switching to renewables, but many other Small Island Developing States are still at the early stages of planning how to integrate renewable energy into their grids. "For a small island we're very far ahead," said Beth Barry, Coordinator of the Anguilla Renewable Energy Office. "We've got an Energy Policy and a draft Climate Change policy and have been focusing efforts on the question of sustainable energy supply for several years now. As a result, we have a lot of information we can share with other islands."

According to a Bloomberg report, due to a skyrocketing interest in artificial intelligence, Anguilla was expected to profit in 2023 from a surge in demand for web addresses ending with the country's top-level domain .ai. The total number of registrations of .ai domain names had already doubled in 2022, and according to Vince Cate, who has managed the top-level domain, Anguilla will bring in as much as $30 million in domain-registration fees for 2023. As of 2024, the government reported 105.5 million East Caribbean dollars (US$39m), about a quarter of the government's total revenue for the year, and expects this to increase by another 25% next year.

== Transportation ==
=== Air ===
Anguilla is served by Clayton J. Lloyd International Airport (prior to 4 July 2010 known as Wallblake Airport). The primary runway at the airport is 5,462 feet (1,665 m) in length and can accommodate moderate-sized aircraft. Regional scheduled passenger services connect to various other Caribbean islands via local airlines.

In December 2021 Anguilla inaugurated its first ever international regular commercial jet service flight to and from the mainland U.S. American Eagle operating on behalf of American Airlines began nonstop Embraer 175 regional jet service to Anguilla from Miami in an aviation watershed moment for Anguilla with the airport also currently attempting to attract other international air carriers.

Other airlines currently serving the airport include Tradewind Aviation and Cape Air which provide scheduled air service to San Juan, Puerto Rico. Several other small airlines serve the airport as well.

The airport can handle large narrow-body jets such as the Boeing 737 and Airbus A320 and has growing private jet service flights with a new private jet terminal being built.

=== Road ===
Aside from taxis, there is no public transport on the island. Cars drive on the left and most roads are unsealed. There is no rail network.

=== Boat ===
There are regular ferries from Saint Martin to Anguilla. It is a 20-minute crossing from Marigot, St. Martin, to Blowing Point, Anguilla.

There is also a charter service which offers boat trips from Blowing Point, Anguilla, to Princess Juliana Airport.

== See also ==
- Bibliography of Anguilla
- Outline of Anguilla
- Index of Anguilla-related articles
