= 1967 Anguillian separation referendum =

| 11 July 1967 |

Results
| Choice | Votes | % |
|---|---|---|
| Yes | 1,813 | 99.72% |
| No | 5 | 0.28% |
| Valid votes | 1,818 | 100.00% |
| Invalid or blank votes | 0 | 0.00% |
| Total votes | 1,818 | 100.00% |
| Registered voters/turnout | 2,554 | 71.18% |

A referendum on separating from Saint Kitts and Nevis was held in Anguilla on 11 July 1967. In February Anguilla had become part of the Saint Christopher-Nevis-Anguilla federation. However, on 30 May the police were expelled and a "Peace Keeping Committee" installed as a government. The referendum was approved by 99.72% of voters, and the following day "President" Ronald Webster declared the separation. However, his new government was not recognised by either the Saint Christopher-Nevis-Anguilla federation or the United Kingdom.

== Results ==
| Choice | Votes | % |
|---|---|---|
| For | 1,813 | 99.72 |
| Against | 5 | 0.28 |
| Total | 1,818 | 100.00 |
| Registered voters/turnout | 2,554 | – |
Source: Direct Democracy

== Aftermath ==
A related referendum was held in 1969 with similar results.
