= List of universities in the Netherlands =

A listing of universities in the Kingdom of the Netherlands:

== Research universities ==
Research universities in the Netherlands are institutions of tertiary education that in Dutch are called universiteit. Their focus is towards academic education and scientific research. They are accredited to confer bachelor's, master's and (with the exception of the Netherlands Defence Academy) doctoral degrees. Prior to the Bologna Process, the universities granted drs. (doctorandus), mr. (for law studies) and ir. (for engineering studies) degrees, which are equivalent to current MA, LLM or MSc degrees. The term universiteit is reserved to doctorate granting institutes in the Dutch context, and the additional qualifier "research" is hardly ever used in practice.

There are Semi-Public Universities and Private Universities in Netherlands. The semi-public status of most Dutch universities arises from the fact that they have both public and private characteristics. In this respect, their public funding is entirely output-based, determined by the number of undergraduate and graduate degrees delivered. Except for this output-based funding, Dutch universities are largely private entities that, since 1998, own and operate their real estate at their own risk; moreover, all employees of Dutch universities have labor contracts based on private sector terms (as of 2020).

Name	Established	University status	City	Organisation	Type	Number of staff	Number of students
Members of the Universities of the Netherlands association
University of Amsterdam	1632	1877	Amsterdam	Semi-public	Research university	4,062	32,739
Academic Medical Center	1983		Amsterdam	Semi-public	Research university	4,062	32,739
Amsterdam University College	2008		Amsterdam	Semi-public	Research university	4,062	32,739
Vrije Universiteit Amsterdam	1880	1880	Amsterdam	Special: Protestant	Research university	2,200	18,000
VU University Medical Center	1964		Amsterdam	Special: Protestant	Research university	2,200	18,000
Amsterdam University College	2008		Amsterdam	Special: Protestant	Research university	2,200	18,000
University of Groningen	1614	1614	Groningen	Semi-public	Research university	5,000	26,500
University Medical Center Groningen	2005		Groningen	Semi-public	Research university	5,000	26,500
Leiden University	1575	1575	Leiden	Semi-public	Research university	3,973	19,328
Leiden University Medical Center	1996		Leiden	Semi-public	Research university	3,973	19,328
Leiden University College The Hague	2010		The Hague	Semi-public	Research university	3,973	19,328
Maastricht University	1976	1975	Maastricht	Semi-public	Research university	3,000	11,463
Academic Hospital Maastricht	1974		Maastricht	Semi-public	Research university	3,000	11,463
University College Maastricht	2002		Maastricht	Semi-public	Research university	3,000	11,463
Radboud University	1923	1923	Nijmegen	Special: Catholic	Research university	4,309*	17,650*
Radboud University Medical Center	1956		Nijmegen	Special: Catholic	Research university	4,309*	17,650*
Erasmus University Rotterdam	1913	1937	Rotterdam	Semi-public	Research university	3,700	26,212
Erasmus MC	1950		Rotterdam	Semi-public	Research university	3,700	3,361
Erasmus University College	2013		Rotterdam	Semi-public	Research university	3,700	270
Tilburg University	1927	1939	Tilburg	Special: Catholic	Research university	1,062*	11,399*
University College Tilburg	2008		Tilburg	Special: Catholic	Research university	1,062*	11,399*
TIAS School for Business and Society	1982		Tilburg	Special: Catholic	Research university	1,062*	11,399*
Utrecht University	1636	1636	Utrecht	Semi-public	Research university	8,224	26,787
University Medical Center Utrecht	1999		Utrecht	Semi-public	Research university	8,224	26,787
University College Utrecht	1998		Utrecht	Semi-public	Research university	8,224	26,787
University College Roosevelt	2004		Middelburg	Semi-public	University College	8,224	26,787
Delft University of Technology	1842	1905	Delft	Semi-public	Technical university	5,400	24,000
Eindhoven University of Technology	1956	1956	Eindhoven	Semi-public	Technical university	3,000	12,000
University of Twente	1961	1961	Enschede	Semi-public	Technical university	3,000	8,500
Wageningen University & Research	2000	1918	Wageningen	Semi-public	Technical university	6,500^{##}	12,847
Wageningen University	1876	1918	Wageningen	Semi-public	Technical university	6,500^{##}	12,847
Wageningen Research	1877		throughout the Netherlands	Research Institutes	Technical university	6,500^{##}	12,847
Open University in the Netherlands	1984	1984	Nationwide; main office in Heerlen	Semi-public	Open university	673	16,888
Other universities
University of Curaçao	1979	1979	Curaçao	Public	National university		
University of Humanistic Studies	1989	1989	Utrecht	Semi-public	Research university	150	550
Netherlands Defence Academy	1823	2005	Breda/Den Helder	Special: National Military Academy	Military Academy, since 2005 includes Department of Military Sciences	~75	~200
Privately Funded Universities (accredited as Universiteit by Dutch law) (by type)
Nyenrode Business University	1946	1982	Breukelen	Private	Business school		
Protestant Theological University	1854	1939	Originally Kampen, moved to Amsterdan and Groningen (2010) and then to Utrecht (2024)	Private	University for Protestant Theology		
Theological University of the Reformed Churches	1854	1939	Originally Kampen, moved to Utrecht in 2021	Private	University for Protestant Theology		
Theological University of Apeldoorn	1894	1962	Apeldoorn	Private	University for Protestant Theology		
Universities that no longer exist
Catholic University of Utrecht	1991–2007		Utrecht	Private: merged into University of Tilburg	University for Catholic Theology		
University of Harderwijk	1648–1811		Harderwijk	disbanded by Napoleon			
University of Franeker	1585–1811		Franeker	disbanded by Napoleon, since 2017 the Academie van Franeker was developed to revive the academic traditions of Franeker, and Euler-Franeker memorial university honours its heritage with several programmes accredited by the National Accreditation Agency of Curaçao			
University of Nijmegen	1655–1680		Nijmegen	closed in the aftermath of the 1672 rampjaar			
University of Theology and Pastorate	1966-1999		Heerlen	Private: merged into Radboud University in 1993, Heerlen location closed 1999	University for Catholic Theology		

† 2003–2004; ‡ 2004–2005; # 2005–2006; * 2006–2007; ##including research staff at the associated institutes. All figures without signs are estimates or from undated sources. According to Dutch law, it is illegal to use protected titles which can only be given by universities that are accredited. Protected titles are ing. bc. mr. ir. drs. and dr. English variants (MSc BSc MA BA LLB LLM BEng PhD) are not (yet) protected by Dutch law (but using the title "dr." based on a PhD degree, without permission from DUO, is a violation of Dutch law as the title "doctor" is protected). One may bear in the Netherlands foreign titles according to the laws of the country wherein they were granted, but without translating them in Dutch.

== Universities of applied sciences ==
Universities of applied sciences (Dutch: hogeschool) in the Netherlands are focused on professional education rather than scientific research. While the literal translation of hogeschool is "high school", these are second-tier institutes of higher education, and can be compared with colleges or polytechnics or similar in other countries. They are accredited to confer bachelor's and master's degrees. Prior to the Bologna Process, they also conferred professional engineer's (abbreviated ing.) degrees. Dutch universities of applied sciences are not accredited to confer doctoral (PhD) degrees; PhD studies can sometimes be conducted in the context of a university of applied sciences, however, the title will be granted by one of the research universities, and a full professor of that university will be appointed as principal supervisor (promotor). In international contexts, the phrase University of Applied Sciences is used for the majority of these schools, as suggested by the Dutch Minister of Education. Some specific exceptions have been made. For example, tertiary art schools and schools of education use an internationally recognisable name of choice.

The Dutch Universities of Applied Sciences funded by the government are:

- Aeres Hogeschool, Dronten, Almere and Wageningen
- Amsterdam University of Applied Sciences (Dutch: Hogeschool van Amsterdam), Amsterdam
- Amsterdam University of the Arts (Dutch: Amsterdamse Hogeschool voor de Kunsten), Amsterdam
- ArtEZ University of Arts (Dutch: ArtEZ hogeschool voor de kunsten), Arnhem, Enschede and Zwolle
- Avans University of Applied Sciences (Dutch: Avans Hogeschool), 's-Hertogenbosch, Tilburg, Breda, Etten-Leur
- Breda University of Applied Sciences, Breda
- Codarts University of the Arts (Dutch: Codarts hogeschool voor de kunsten), Rotterdam
- Design Academy Eindhoven, Eindhoven
- Driestar Christian University (Dutch: Driestar hogeschool), Gouda
- Ede Christian University of Applied Sciences (Dutch: Christelijke Hogeschool Ede), Ede
- Fontys University of Applied Sciences (Dutch: Fontys Hogeschool), Eindhoven, 's-Hertogenbosch, Sittard, Tilburg and Venlo
  - Fontys School of Fine and Performing Arts (Dutch: Fontys Hogeschool voor de Kunsten), Tilburg
- Gerrit Rietveld Academie (also known as: Rietveld School of Art & Design and Rietveld Academy), Amsterdam
- HAN University of Applied Sciences, Arnhem and Nijmegen
- Hanze University of Applied Sciences (Dutch: Hanzehogeschool Groningen), Groningen
- HAS Green Academy, 's-Hertogenbosch and Venlo
- Hogeschool De Kempel, Helmond
- Hogeschool IPABO, Alkmaar and Amsterdam
- Hogeschool KPZ, Zwolle
- HU University of Applied Sciences Utrecht (Dutch: Hogeschool Utrecht), Utrecht
- Hotelschool The Hague, Amsterdam and The Hague
- HZ University of Applied Sciences, Vlissingen and Middelburg
- Inholland University of Applied Sciences (Dutch: Hogeschool Inholland), Alkmaar, Amsterdam, Delft, Diemen, Dordrecht, Haarlem, Rotterdam and The Hague
- Iselinge Hogeschool, Doetinchem
- Marnix Academie, Utrecht
- NHL Stenden University of Applied Sciences (Dutch: NHL Stenden Hogeschool), Leeuwarden, Emmen, Meppel and Terschelling
- Rotterdam University of Applied Sciences (Dutch: Hogeschool Rotterdam), Rotterdam
- Saxion University of Applied Sciences (Dutch: Hogeschool Saxion), Enschede, Deventer and Apeldoorn
- The Hague University of Applied Sciences (Dutch: De Haagse Hogeschool), The Hague
- Thomas More Hogeschool, Rotterdam
- University of Applied Sciences Leiden (Dutch: Hogeschool Leiden), Leiden
- University of the Arts The Hague (Dutch: Hogeschool der Kunsten Den Haag), The Hague
  - Royal Academy of Art (Dutch: Koninklijke Academie van Beeldende Kunsten), The Hague
  - Royal Conservatoire (Dutch: Koninklijk Conservatorium), The Hague
- Utrecht School of the Arts (Dutch: Hogeschool voor de Kunsten Utrecht), Utrecht
- Van Hall Larenstein University of Applied Sciences (Dutch: Hogeschool Van Hall Larenstein), Leeuwarden and Velp
- Viaa Christian University of Applied Sciences (Dutch: Hogeschool Viaa), Zwolle
- Windesheim University of Applied Sciences, Zwolle and Almere
- Zuyd University of Applied Sciences (Dutch: Zuyd Hogeschool), Heerlen, Maastricht and Sittard
  - Maastricht Academy of Dramatic Arts (Dutch: Toneelacademie Maastricht), Maastricht
  - Maastricht Institute of Arts, Maastricht
  - Maastricht Academy of Music (Dutch: Conservatorium Maastricht), Maastricht
  - Maastricht School of Translation and Interpreting (Dutch: Vertaalacademie Maastricht), Maastricht

=== Former universities of applied sciences (not exhaustive) ===
- Stoas Hogeschool, Dronten, 's-Hertogenbosch, Wageningen => merged into: Aeres Hogeschool
- Christelijke Agrarische Hogeschool Dronten, Dronten => merged into: Aeres Hogeschool
- Christelijke Hogeschool Nederland, Leeuwarden => merged into: NHL Stenden Hogeschool
- Hogeschool De Horst, Driebergen => merged into: Hogeschool Utrecht
- Hogeschool Helicon, Zeist => merged into: Hogeschool Leiden
- Hogeschool Domstad, Utrecht => merged into: Hogeschool Utrecht
- Hogeschool Edith Stein / Onderwijscentrum Twente, Hengelo => merged into: Saxion Hogeschool
- Hogeschool voor Economische Studies (HES), Amsterdam => merged into: Hogeschool van Amsterdam
- Hogeschool voor Economische Studies (HES), Rotterdam => merged into: Hogeschool Rotterdam

== Private for-profit medical schools ==
Although there are none of these schools in the mainland, many exist in the Dutch Caribbean either in the special municipalities of the Netherlands or constituents countries of the Kingdom of the Netherlands. Only one (Saba University) has direct accreditation from Accreditation Organisation of the Netherlands and Flanders, which accredits universities in the Netherlands and Flanders.

- Aureus University School of Medicine
- Xavier University School of Medicine
- Avalon University School of Medicine
- St. Martinus University Faculty of Medicine
- Saba University School of Medicine
- American University of Integrative Sciences
- American University of the Caribbean School of Medicine

== Private for-profit business schools and other universities of applied sciences ==
A number of private universities of applied sciences (hogescholen) are active in the Netherlands. Some of these are exclusively distance learning (online) medium learning providers.

- Euler-Franeker Memorial University, Willemstad (Curaçao) and Amsterdam
- EuroPort Business College (defunct)
- HBO Nederland (defunct)
- Hogeschool Tio
- Inter College Business School, Amsterdam
- Islamic University of Rotterdam, Rotterdam
- Leidse Onderwijs Instellingen (LOI)
- Markus Verbeek Praehep
- NCOI
- Nederlandse Talen Instituut (NTI)
- Schoevers
- Wittenborg University of Applied Sciences, Apeldoorn

== Webster University: the American university in the Netherlands ==
Webster University Leiden is a university outside the Dutch system, offering Bachelor and Master programs in the Netherlands. Webster University is a private, non-profit American university, accredited in the United States by the Higher Learning Commission's North Central Association. The International Business and Management program, as well as the Applied Behavioral and Social Sciences program are accredited in the Netherlands by the NVAO at the hbo (professional master) level.

== International rankings ==
In relation to their population size, Switzerland (first), Sweden (second) and the Netherlands (third) are the three countries with the highest number of universities among the 100 best of the Academic Ranking of World Universities (2014–2015).

Below are shown the international rankings of the government funded research universities of the Netherlands, and the number of times they rank in the top 200 of one of the six prominent global rankings:

University	QS World (2027)	THE World (2027)	ARWU World (2026)	USNWR World (2026–27)	CWTS Leiden (2026)	CWUR World (2026)	#^{a}
University of Amsterdam	60	62=	101-150	39	50	83	6^{b}
Utrecht University	113=	66^{c}	60	54	94	80	6^{b}
Leiden University	119=	69	101-150	61=	92	87	6^{b}
Erasmus University Rotterdam	148	109	101-150	89	111	111	6^{b}
University of Groningen	157	87	84	77=	159	106	6
Wageningen University & Research	154	66=	101-150	119=	99	199	6
VU University Amsterdam	185=	176=	151-200	91	55	164	6
Delft University of Technology	48	50	151-200	170=	177	268	5
Radboud University	283=	161=	151-200	142=	144	174	5
Maastricht University	254	133=	301-400	183=	259	258	2
Eindhoven University of Technology	152	180=	301-400	400=	338	371	2
University of Twente	223=	201=	501-600	417=	431	487	0
Tilburg University	429	326–350	801-900	651=	329	751	0
Open University Netherlands	N.A.	N.A.	N.A.	1616=	N.A.	N.A.	0
University of Curaçao	N.A.	N.A.	N.A.	N.A.	N.A.	N.A.	0
University of Humanistic Studies	N.A.	N.A.	N.A.	N.A.	N.A.	N.A.	0

Notes:
N.A.: Not Applicable
^{a} Number of times the university is ranked within the top 200 of one of the six global rankings.
^{b} The university is ranked within the top 150 of all six global rankings.
^{c} THE World University Rankings 2023 (rankings thereafter are not available).

== See also ==
- List of colleges and universities by country
- List of colleges and universities
- Academic Degree
