= List of medical schools in the Caribbean =

This is a list of medical schools in the Caribbean. Schools are listed in alphabetical order by country or territory, then by name. The list includes medical schools recognized by their local governments that award the Doctor of Medicine (MD) and/or Bachelor of Medicine, Bachelor of Surgery (MBBS) degrees.

All recognized medical schools are listed in the World Directory of Medical Schools (WDMS). Several agencies may also accredit Caribbean medical schools, as listed in the FAIMER Directory of Organizations that Recognize/Accredit Medical Schools (DORA).

== Categories: Regional vs. Off-shore ==
Caribbean medical schools can be categorized as either "regional" or "offshore". Regional medical schools train students to practice in the country or region where the school is located. This category includes the four schools located in Puerto Rico, which are accredited by the Liaison Committee on Medical Education, the accrediting body for all allopathic medical schools in the United States and Canada. Offshore medical schools in the Caribbean primarily train students from the United States and Canada who intend to return home for residency and clinical practice after graduation. Most offshore medical schools are dual-campus programs: basic sciences are completed in the Caribbean, while clinical clerkships are completed at teaching hospitals in the United States, Canada, and the United Kingdom.

== List of current Caribbean medical schools ==
Country or territory	School	Established	Degree	Regional/offshore	Listed in World Directory of Medical Schools	ECFMG eligible graduates (Sponsor Notes tab)	Graduated students (year 2019 unless otherwise noted)'	Accreditation (by organization(s) listed in DORA-FAIMER directory	UK eligible graduates (Note: As indicated by UK medical councils list of degrees they will not or may not accept)
Anguilla	New Anglia University	2024	MD	Offshore	Yes, F0008660	Yes		Government of Anguilla Higher Education Licensing Board	Yes
Anguilla	American University of Anguilla School of Medicine	2022	MD	Offshore	Yes, F0007696	Yes (From 2025)			Not listed. Maybe accepted.
Antigua and Barbuda	American University of Antigua	2004	MD	Offshore	Yes, F0000993	Yes	216	Accredited by CAAM-HP as of 2022.	Maybe
Antigua and Barbuda	Metropolitan University College Of Medicine	2017	MD	Offshore	Yes, F0005227	No		Applicant to CAAMP-HP accreditation as of August 2022	Maybe
Antigua and Barbuda	Atlantic University School of Medicine	2017	MD	Offshore	Yes, F0004816	No. (Note: In 2017, ECFMG determined that certain officials of the university provided ECFMG with false information and documents.)			No
Antigua and Barbuda	University of Health Sciences Antigua School of Medicine	1983	MD	Offshore	Yes, F0001902	Yes (From 1984)	25 (year 2018)		Not listed. Maybe accepted.
Aruba (NL)	American University School of Medicine Aruba	2018	MD	Offshore	Yes, F0005747	Yes (From 2022)	0		Not listed. Maybe accepted.
Aruba (NL)	Aureus University School of Medicine	2004	MD	Offshore	Yes, F0000848	Yes	22	As of June 14, 2023, Aureus is no longer accredited by ACCM.	Maybe
Aruba (NL)	Nucleus University School of Medicine	2021	MD	Offshore	Yes, F0007309	No			Not listed. Maybe accepted.
Aruba (NL)	Xavier University School of Medicine	2004	MD	Offshore	Yes, F0002232	Yes	22	Accredited for six years until December 31, 2028 by ACCM,	Maybe
Aruba (NL)	Bay University School of Medicine	2020	MD	Offshore	Yes, F0006801	No			Yes
Bahamas	Western Atlantic University School of Medicine	2022	MD	Offshore	Yes, F0007614	Yes		Provisional Accreditation by CAAM-HP.	Not listed. Maybe accepted.
Barbados	American University of Barbados	2011	MD	Offshore	Yes, F0002490	Yes		Initial Provisional Accreditation by CAAM-HP for 2018–2020	Not listed. Maybe accepted.
Barbados	American University of Integrative Sciences	1999	MD	Offshore	Yes, F0000410	Yes	40 (year 2018)	Candidacy for Accreditation by CAAM-HP pending full site visit as of February 2021	Not listed. Maybe accepted.
Barbados	Bridgetown International University	2019	MD	Offshore	Yes, F0004994	No			Not listed. Maybe accepted.
Barbados	International University of Barbados School of Medicine	2017	MD	Offshore	Yes, F0005054	No			Not listed. Maybe accepted.
Barbados	Queen's University College of Medicine	2018	MBBS or MD	Offshore	Yes, F0004859	No			Not listed. Maybe accepted.
Barbados	Ross University School of Medicine	1978	MD	Offshore	Yes, F0001354	Yes (From 1979)	637	Accreditation with Conditions extended by CAAM-HP (Review pending).	Yes
Barbados	University of the West Indies Faculty of Medicine (Cave Hill)	1967	MBBS	Regional	Yes, F0000245	Yes	61	Accreditation for five years, 2023-2028 by CAAM-HP	Yes
Barbados	Victoria University of Barbados	2017/19	MD	Offshore	Yes, F0005028	No			Yes
Barbados	Washington University of Barbados School of Medicine	2016	MD	Offshore	Yes, F0004140	No			Not listed. Maybe accepted.
Belize	American Northwest University	2018	MD	Offshore	Yes, F0007783	No			Yes
Belize	Central America Health Sciences University Belize Medical College	1996	MD	Offshore	Yes, F0001805	Yes			Yes
Belize	Washington University of Health & Science	2012	MD	Offshore	Yes, F0002692	Yes			Not listed. Maybe accepted.
Belize	Columbus Central University School of Medicine	2006 (as American Global University School of Medicine)	MD	Offshore	Yes, F0002284	Yes	25		Not listed. Maybe accepted.
Bonaire(NL)	International University School of Medicine (IUSOM)	2010	MD	Offshore	Yes, F0002436	No			Not listed. Maybe accepted.
British Virgin Islands	Ponce Health Sciences University	2024	MD	Offshore	Yes	Yes		Preliminarily accredited by Accreditation Commission on Colleges of Medicine (ACCM)	Yes
Cayman Islands (UK)	St. Matthew's University School of Medicine	1997	MD	Offshore	Yes, F0001649	Yes	31	Accredited for six years to June 30, 2025 by ACCM	Maybe
Cuba	Universidad de Ciencias Médicas de la Habana	1976	MD	Regional	Yes, F0000461	Yes (From 1953)		Cuban Ministry of Higher Education	Yes
Cuba	Escuela Latinoamericana de Medicina	1999	MD	Offshore	Yes, F0000327	Yes	2327	Cuban Ministry of Higher Education	Yes
Cuba	Universidad de Ciencias Médicas de Ciego de Ávila	1978	MD	Regional	Yes, F0000555	Yes		Cuban Ministry of Higher Education	Yes
Cuba	Universidad de Ciencias Medicas de Cienfuegos	1979	MD	Regional	Yes, F0001401	Yes (From 1990)		Cuban Ministry of Higher Education	Yes
Cuba	Universidad de Ciencias Médicas de Granma	1982	MD	Regional	Yes, F0000427	Yes		Cuban Ministry of Higher Education	Yes
Cuba	Universidad de Ciencias Médicas de Holguín	1967	MD	Regional	Yes, F0000510	Yes		Cuban Ministry of Higher Education	Yes
Cuba	Universidad de Ciencias Médicas de Las Tunas	1984	MD	Regional	Yes, F0001402	Yes (From 1986)		Cuban Ministry of Higher Education	Yes
Cuba	Universidad de Ciencias Médicas de Matanzas	1970	MD	Regional	Yes, F0001166	Yes		Cuban Ministry of Higher Education	Yes
Cuba	Universidad de Ciencias Medicas de Pinar del Rio	1968	MD	Regional	Yes, F0001164	Yes (From 1976)		Cuban Ministry of Higher Education	Yes
Cuba	Universidad de Ciencias Médicas de Sancti Spiritus	1986	MD	Regional	Yes, F0000557	Yes (From 1992)		Cuban Ministry of Higher Education	Yes
Cuba	Universidad de Ciencias Médicas de Santiago de Cuba	1962	MD	Regional	Yes, F0000509	Yes (From 1963)		Cuban Ministry of Higher Education	Yes
Cuba	Universidad de Ciencias Médicas de Villa Clara	1966	MD	Regional	Yes, F0001347	Yes (From 1970)		Cuban Ministry of Higher Education	Yes
Cuba	Universidad de Ciencias Medicas de Camaguey	1980	MD	Regional	Yes, F0001833	Yes		Cuban Ministry of Higher Education	Yes
Cuba	Universidad de Ciencias Medicas de Guantanamo	1979	MD	Regional	Yes, F0000556	Yes (From 1984)		Cuban Ministry of Higher Education	Yes
Cuba	Universidad de Ciencias Médicas de Mayabeque	2011	MD	Regional	Yes, F0007534	No			Yes
Curacao (NL)	Avalon University School of Medicine	2003	MD	Offshore	Yes, F0000591	Yes	61	Accredited for six years until December 31, 2028 by CAAM-HP.	Maybe
Curacao (NL)	Caribbean Medical University School of Medicine	2007	MD	Offshore	Yes, F0002431	Yes	372 (2026)	Accredited for 5 years until 2031 by Agency for Accreditation of Educational Programs and Organizations (AAEPO), Kyrgyzstan a WFME Accredited Agency	Yes
Curacao (NL)	John F. Kennedy University School of Medicine	2014	MD	Offshore	Yes, F0003392	Yes (From 2015)			Yes
Curacao (NL)	St. Martinus University Faculty of Medicine	2003	MD	Offshore	Yes, F0000044	Yes	28	Accredited for five years until December 4, 2028 by Agency for Accreditation of Educational Programs and Organizations (AAEPO), Kyrgyzstan a WFME Accredited Agency	Yes
Dominica	All Saints University School of Medicine	2006	MD	Offshore	Yes, F0002272	Yes	37		Not listed. Maybe accepted.
Dominica	American Canadian School of Medicine (ACSOM)	2023	MD	Offshore	Yes, F0008211	Yes		Preliminary Accredited since 2023 by ACCM Accredited since 2023 by IAAR	Not listed. Maybe accepted.
Dominican Republic	Instituto Tecnológico de Santo Domingo Escuela de Medicina	1972	MD	Regional	Yes, F0001847	Yes (From 1978)	196	Ministry of Higher Education, Science and Technology, Accreditation with Conditions for 5 years, 2018 - 2023 by CAAM-HP.	Yes
Dominican Republic	Pontificia Universidad Católica Madre y Maestra Departamento de Medicina	1974	MD	Regional	Yes, F0000465	Yes (From 1978)	149	Ministry of Higher Education, Science and Technology	Yes
Dominican Republic	Universidad Autónoma de Santo Domingo Departamento de Medicina	1538	MD	Regional	Yes, F0001356	Yes (From 1953)		Ministry of Higher Education, Science and Technology	Yes
Dominican Republic	Universidad Católica Nordestana Facultad de Ciencias Medicas	1978	MD	Regional	Yes, F0001357	Yes (From 1979)	256	Ministry of Higher Education, Science and Technology	Yes
Dominican Republic	Universidad Católica Tecnológica del Cibao Escuela de Medicina	1983	MD	Regional	Yes, F0001835	Yes (From 1984))		Ministry of Higher Education, Science and Technology	Yes
Dominican Republic	Universidad Central del Este Escuela de Medicina	1971	MD	Regional	Yes, F0001355	Yes	462 (2017)	Ministry of Higher Education, Science and Technology	Yes
Dominican Republic	Universidad Iberoamericana (UNIBE) Escuela de Medicina	1983	MD	Offshore	Yes, F0001836	Yes (From 1988)	195	Accreditation for 5 years, 2023-2028 by CAAM-HP.	Yes
Dominican Republic	Universidad Nacional Pedro Henríquez Ureña Escuela de Medicina	1966	MD	Regional	Yes, F0000518	Yes (From 1973)	110	Ministry of Higher Education, Science and Technology	Yes
Dominican Republic	Universidad Tecnológica de Santiago Escuela de Medicina, Santiago de Los Caballeros	1979	MD	Regional	Yes, F0000661	Yes		Secretary of State for Higher Education, Science and Technology	Yes
Dominican Republic	Universidad Tecnológica de Santiago Escuela de Medicina, Santo Domingo	1981	MD	Regional	Yes, F0001358	Yes		Ministry of Higher Education, Science and Technology	Yes
Dominican Republic	O&Med Medical School, Escuela de Medicina de la Universidad Dominicana O&M	2013	MD	Regional	Yes, F0003600	Yes		Ministry of Higher Education, Science and Technology	Yes
French Guiana (France)	University de Guyane	2014	MD	Regional	As former University of the French West Indies and Guiana, F0000663	Yes (From 2000)			Not listed. Maybe accepted.
Grenada	St. George's University School of Medicine	1977	MD	Offshore	Yes, F0000768	Yes	1101	Grenada Ministry of Health, Voluntarily Withdrawn (January 2021) from CAAM-HP.	Yes
Guadeloupe and Martinique (France)	Université des Antilles	1982	MD	Regional	As former University of the French West Indies and Guiana, F0000663	Yes (From 2000)			Not listed. Maybe accepted.
Guyana	University of Guyana	1985	MBBS	Regional	Yes, F0001261	Yes		Accreditation with Conditions, 2017-2022 by CAAM-HP.	Yes
Guyana	American International School of Medicine	2000	MD	Offshore	Yes, F0001260	Yes	15 (year 2016)		Maybe
Guyana	Georgetown American University	2014	MD	Offshore	Yes, F0003427	Yes			Not listed. Maybe accepted.
Guyana	Green Heart Medical University	2005	MD	Offshore	Yes, F0002252	Yes			Not listed. Maybe accepted.
Guyana	Lincoln American University	2017	MD	Offshore	Yes, F0004722	Yes			Maybe
Guyana	Texila American University	2011	MD	Offshore	Yes, F0002428	Yes	24	Accreditation for 3 years, 2023 - 2026 by CAAM-HP. Accreditation for 6 years, 2023 – 2029 by ACCM.	Not listed. Maybe accepted.
Guyana	Twin Island University School of Medicine	2014	MD	Offshore	Yes, F0007797	No			Not listed. Maybe accepted.
Guyana	Rajiv Gandhi University of Science and Technology School of Medicine	2012	MD	Offshore	Yes, F0003494	Yes (From 2016)			Not listed. Maybe accepted.
Guyana	American School of Medicine	2022	MD	Offshore	Yes, F0007840	No			Not listed. Maybe accepted.
Guyana	Narendra Modi School of Medicine	2023	MD	Offshore	Yes, F0008337	No			Not listed. Maybe accepted.
Guyana	North Shore Medical Institute	2023	MD	Offshore	Yes, F0008009	No			Not listed. Maybe accepted.
Haiti	Université Chrétienne de la Communauté de Caïman Faculté de Médecine	2012	MD	Regional	Yes, F0008170	No			Yes
Haiti	Université d'Etat d'Haïti Faculté de Médecine	1867	MD	Regional	Yes, F0000770	Yes (From 1953)			Yes
Haiti	Université Lumière Faculté de Médecine	2006	MD	Regional	Yes, F0002410	Yes			Yes
Haiti	Université Notre Dame d'Haïti Faculté de Médecine	1997	MD	Regional	Yes, F0000708	Yes (From 2002)			Yes
Haiti	Université Quisqueya Faculté des Sciences de la Santé	2002	MD	Regional	Yes, F0000709	Yes			Yes
Haiti	Université St François d’Assise Faculté de Médecine et Science de la Santé	2016	MD	Regional	Yes, F0008171	No			Yes
Haiti	Université Joseph Lafortune Faculté de Médecine	2005	MD	Regional	Yes, F0002883	No			Yes
Haiti	Université Royale d'Haïti Faculté des Sciences de la Santé	2015	MD	Regional	Yes, F0005005	No			Yes
Haiti	Université de la Fondation Dr. Aristide Faculté de Médecine	2011	MD	Regional	Yes, F0005006	No			Yes
Jamaica	All American Institute of Medical Sciences	2011	MD	Offshore	Yes, F0002376	Yes		"Initial Provisional Accreditation Withdrawn" by CAAM-HP.	Not listed. Maybe accepted.
Jamaica	University of the West Indies Faculty of Medicine (Mona)	1948	MBBS	Regional	Yes, F0000014	Yes (From 1953)	279	Accreditation for five years, 2023-2028 by CAAM-HP.	Yes
Jamaica	Caribbean School of Medical Sciences	2015	MD	Off-shore	Yes, F0004969	No			Not listed. Maybe accepted.
Jamaica	Bioprist Institute of Medical Sciences	2024	MD	Regional				Accredited by CAAM-HP 2024.	Not listed. Maybe accepted.
Montserrat (UK)	University of Science, Arts and Technology Faculty of Medicine	2003	MD	Offshore	Yes, F0000836	No (Note: Yes in years 2003 – 2018. In 2018, ECFMG determined that a certain official of the University of Science, Arts & Technology engaged in irregular behavior in connection with providing false information to ECFMG.)		"Not accredited" by CAAM-HP.	Not listed. Maybe accepted.
Montserrat (UK)	Vanguard University School of Medicine	2014	MD	Off-shore	Yes, F0003145	No		Not accredited. CAAM-HP decided that Initial Provisional Accreditation be withdrawn and recommended that the school re-apply for accreditation in two (2) years, in 2017. School did not re-apply	Not listed. Maybe accepted.
Puerto Rico	University of Puerto Rico School of Medicine	1950	MD	Regional	Yes, F0000139	Not Applicable		Not Applicable	Yes
Puerto Rico	Universidad Central del Caribe School of Medicine	1979	MD	Regional	Yes, F0000137	Not Applicable		Not Applicable	Yes
Puerto Rico	Ponce Health Sciences University School of Medicine	1980	MD	Regional	Yes, F0000138	Not Applicable		Not Applicable	Yes
Puerto Rico	San Juan Bautista School of Medicine	1979	MD	Regional	Yes, F0002338	Not Applicable		Not Applicable	Yes
Saba (NL)	Saba University School of Medicine	1993	MSc (MD until 2010/14)	Offshore	Yes, F0001887	Yes (From 1994)	134	Accreditation Organisation of the Netherlands and Flanders (NVAO)	Yes
Saint Kitts and Nevis	International University of the Health Sciences (IUHS)	1998	MD	Offshore	Yes, F0001171	Yes		Accreditation Board of Saint Kitts and Nevis	Maybe
Saint Kitts and Nevis	University of Medicine and Health Sciences	2008	MD	Offshore	Yes, F0002044	Yes	126	Re-accredited for three years to December 31, 2024 by ACCM. Accreditation Board of Saint Kitts and Nevis	Not listed. Maybe accepted.
Saint Kitts and Nevis	Medical University of the Americas	2000	MD	Offshore	Yes, F0001163	Yes	88	ACCM, Accredited for three years to December 31, 2025	Yes
Saint Kitts and Nevis	Windsor University School of Medicine	2000	MD	Offshore	Yes, F0001715	Yes		Accreditation for 2 years, 2023 - 2025 by CAAM-HP.	Partially (Note: Maybe for students who graduated on or before 30 October 2012; Yes for students who graduated thereafter)
Saint Kitts and Nevis	Universal Caribbean University School of Medicine	2018	MD	Offshore	Yes, F0005094	No			Not listed. Maybe accepted.
Saint Lucia	American International Medical University	2007	MD	Offshore	Yes, F0002364	Yes	16 (year 2009)	"Accreditation denied" (July 2018) by CAAM-HP.	YesNot listed. Maybe accepted.
Saint Lucia	College of Medicine and Health Sciences/aka Destiny University	2001	MD	Offshore	Yes, F0001374	2001 - 2017	8 (year 2007)		Maybe
Saint Lucia	Commonwealth University College of Medicine	2019	BS-MD	Offshore	Yes, F0007248	No			Not listed. Maybe accepted.
Saint Lucia	International American University College of Medicine	2004	MD	Offshore	Yes, F0000976	Yes	31 (year 2017)		Not listed. Maybe accepted.
Saint Lucia	Spartan Health Sciences University	1980	MD	Offshore	Yes, F0000517	Yes	22		Partially (Note: Yes before 2009, but only possibly/maybe from courses that commenced on or after 01.01.2009)
Saint Lucia	Washington Medical Sciences Institute	2011	MD	Offshore	Yes, F0002561	No			Maybe
Saint Vincent and the Grenadines	Richmond Gabriel University	2011	MD	Offshore	Yes, F0002495	Yes		"Not Accredited" by CAAM-HP.	Maybe
Saint Vincent and the Grenadines	American University of St Vincent School of Medicine	2012	MD	Offshore	Yes, F0002562	Yes	4		Maybe
Saint Vincent and the Grenadines	Saint James School of Medicine	2000	MD	Offshore	Yes, F0001852	Yes	25	ACCM	Maybe
Saint Vincent and the Grenadines	Trinity School of Medicine	2008	MD	Offshore	Yes, F0001966	Yes	50 (year 2016)	Accreditation for 3 years, 2019-2022 by CAAM-HP.	Yes
Sint Maarten(NL)	American University of the Caribbean School of Medicine	1978	MD	Offshore	Yes, F0000464	Yes (From 1979)	362	Accredited for six years to December 31, 2027 by ACCM	Maybe
Suriname	Anton de Kom University of Suriname Faculty of Medical Sciences	1892	Physician	Regional (Exclusively)	Yes, F0000168	Yes (From 1953)			Yes
Trinidad and Tobago	University of the West Indies Faculty of Medicine (St. Augustine)	1967	MBBS	Regional	Yes, F0001442	Yes (From 1989)	236 (year 2017)	Accreditation for five years, 2023-2028 by CAAM-HP.	Yes

== See also ==
- Caribbean Accreditation Authority for Education in Medicine and other Health Professions
- Accreditation Commission of Colleges of Medicine
- World Directory of Medical Schools
- International medical graduate
- Offshore medical school
- List of medical schools
