= Caribbean Accreditation Authority for Education in Medicine and other Health Professions =

Transnational accrediting body

The Caribbean Accreditation Authority for Education in Medicine and other Health Professions (CAAM-HP) is an accrediting body for the education programmes and schools of medicine, dentistry, veterinary medicine, nursing and other health professions in the 15 member nations of the Caribbean Community (CARICOM). CAAM-HP was established in 2003 and is headquartered in Kingston, Jamaica.

The US Department of Education's National Committee on Foreign Medical Education and Accreditation (NCFMEA) recognizes CAAM-HP as a standard comparable to the standards used in medical schools in the United States.

== Background and role ==
From 1948 until 2001, universities and colleges in the Commonwealth Caribbean could and often were accredited by the General Medical Council (GMC) of the United Kingdom. Primarily this occurred with the University of the West Indies (UWI) receiving full accreditation (with periodic visits and assessments as changes were made in medical education) and with some of the other schools established since 1974 in the Commonwealth Caribbean receiving limited registration status from the GMC. This international recognition of their degrees meant that the medical education programme offered at UWI allowed graduates to register freely in the UK and many other Commonwealth countries in order to practice.

This practice by the GMC however was ended in 2001 as it sought to replace the original two-tier system of registration of overseas qualified doctors with a single method in keeping with European Union regulations regarding academic and professional training programmes. As a result, the proposed system rendered unnecessary the need to continue accrediting overseas institutions, even those with previously recognized qualifications, leaving the UWI and other institutions without accreditation by an internationally recognized body.

In parallel to these events there was a raft of establishments of "offshore" medical schools in the Caribbean starting in the 1970s, which catered almost exclusively to international students mainly from the United States and Canada. These medical schools were easier to establish in the Caribbean than in mainland North America, in part because unlike the medical schools in the US or Canada, they are not required by the Liaison Committee on Medical Education (LCME; the accrediting body for medical education in the US and Canada) to do research and perform clinical training. Sometimes only needing a business licence in order to be opened, these offshore medical schools had been able to list in the International Medical Education Directory (IMED), which qualifies their students to undergo the Educational Commission for Foreign Medical Graduates (ECFMG) certification process in order to begin residency or fellowship programmes in the US or Canada. The departments of education from both United States and Canada contacted the ECFMG and have required that all Caribbean offshore medical schools be at the standard of United States and Canadian medical schools. The ultimate outgrowth of this over the time was the announcement in 2010 by the ECFMG that effective in 2023, physicians applying for ECFMG Certification will be required to graduate from a medical school that has been appropriately accredited through a formal process that uses criteria comparable to those established for US medical schools by the LCME or that uses other globally accepted criteria, such as those put forth by the World Federation for Medical Education (WFME).

As a result of these developments up to 2001-2002 and the regional desire to ensure quality education and training within CARICOM for the UWI and other medical schools in the Caribbean, such as those established the University of Suriname in 1969 and at the University of Guyana in 1985, as well as the offshore medical schools, a regional accreditation system was established.

Thus, the Agreement establishing the Caribbean Accreditation Authority for Education in Medicine and Other Health Professions was signed in November 2003 by 5 CARICOM Member States and the authority itself was launched shortly after in July 2004. As of 2019, 13 CARICOM Member States have signed up to the Agreement on CAAM-HP and are participating territories: Antigua & Barbuda, The Bahamas, Barbados, Belize, Dominica, Grenada, Guyana, Jamaica, St. Kitts & Nevis, St. Lucia, St. Vincent & the Grenadines, Suriname, and Trinidad & Tobago. Participation is open to all other CARICOM Member States and Associate Member States according to the Agreement, with the British Virgin Islands becoming the first Associate Member to sign on to the Agreement on 18 February 2020 at the 31st Intersessional Meeting of the CARICOM Heads of Government. On 20 May 2019, CAAM-HP also signed a Memorandum of Understanding (MOU) with the Ministry of Higher Education Science and Technology (MESCYT) of the Dominican Republic in Santo Domingo to provide accreditation services for medical training programmes and to facilitate their acceptance by the 11 Universities of the Dominican Republic that have medical schools.

Once established Authority looked at the standards of the GMC and the LCME, and developed comparable standards. These standards and processes were then adjudged to be compliant with international standards in 2012, following a review in 2011 by the WFME and the Foundation for Advancement of International Medical Education and Research (FAIMER). With such international recognition granted only a few years after ECFMG's announcement concerning the need for prospective applicants to have graduated from appropriately accredited schools, it meant that CAAM-HP could continue the process of accrediting the Caribbean offshore medical schools as well as regional medical schools.

Students of those schools that do not receive accreditation from a regional accrediting body recognized by the World Federation for Medical Education (WFME) will not be able to complete neither USMLE examinations nor MCCQE, and therefore will not be able to become United States or Canadian doctors, if their school is not certified by the year 2023. CAAM-HP is one of the primary accrediting bodies for Caribbean medical schools.

== List of schools assessed by CAAM-HP ==
=== Medical schools ===
School	Status	Last updated
All American Institute of Medical Sciences	Initial Provisional Accreditation Withdrawn	July 2016
All Saints University School of Medicine	Not Accredited	July 2017
American International Medical University	Accreditation Denied	July 2018
American University of Antigua	Accredited for 4 years, 2018–2022	July 2018
American University of Barbados	Initial Provisional Accreditation for 2 years, 2018–2020	Sep 2021
American University of Integrative Sciences	Full Accreditation Review Pending	Nov 2020
Avalon University School of Medicine	Accredited	Provisional Accreditation for 3 years, 2019–2022
British International University	Accreditation Withdrawn	July 2009
Caribbean Medical University	Accreditation denied	July 2018
Commonwealth University College of Medicine	Candidacy for 2 years, 2019–2021	Jul 2019
Global University Schools of Medicine and Public Health	Initial provisional accreditation withdrawn	July 2015
Instituto Tecnológico de Santo Domingo	Accreditation with conditions for 5 years, 2018–2023	July 2018
International American University College of Medicine	Accreditation Withdrawn	Nov 2020
Ross University School of Medicine	Accreditation Review Pending	May 2020
Saint James School of Medicine, Anguilla	Follow-up site visit due whenever travel restrictions are lifted	July 2019
Spartan Health Sciences University	Programme placed on Probation for 3 years, 2019 - 2022	Nov 2020
St. George’s University School of Medicine	Voluntarily withdrawn, 2021	Jan 2021
Texila American University	Accreditation for 3 years, 2023 - 2026	January 2023
The University of the West Indies School of Medicine	Accreditation for five years, 2023–2028	July 2023
Trinity Medical Sciences University	Accreditation for 3 years, 2019–2022	Nov 2020
University of Guyana School of Medicine	Accreditation with Conditions, 2017–2022	Jan 2021
University of Science, Arts and Technology	Not accredited	June 2012
Vanguard University School of Medicine (Montserrat)	Not accredited	July 2015
Western Atlantic University School of Medicine	Provisional Accreditation	July 2024
Windsor University School of Medicine	Accreditation for 2 years, 2023 - 2025	January 2023
Xavier University School of Medicine	Voluntarily Withdrawn	Feb 2020

=== Dental schools ===
School	Status	Last updated
The University of the West Indies School of Dentistry, Jamaica	Programme placed on Probation for 3 years, 2020 - 2023	July 2023
The University of the West Indies School of Dentistry, Trinidad	Accreditation for 4 years, 2019–2023	July 2023
The University of Guyana School of Dentistry, Guyana	Accreditation denied	July 2018

=== Veterinary schools ===
School	Status	Last updated
The University of the West Indies School of Veterinary Medicine	Accreditation With Conditions	July 2023
Xavier University School of Medicine	Candidacy	July 2023

Schools in CARICOM member countries not appearing above have either not been assessed by CAAM-HP or are pending accreditation.

== See also ==
- List of medical schools in the Caribbean
- Accreditation Commission of Colleges of Medicine
