= Trinity Medical Sciences University =

- Type: Private medical school
- Established: 2008
- Chancellor: W. Douglas Skelton, MD
- Dean: John P. Geisler, MD
- Students: 630
- Location: Atlanta, Georgia, U.S. Baltimore, Maryland, U.S. Kingstown, Saint Vincent and the Grenadines; 13.132917°N 61.186608°W
- Website: www.trinityschoolofmedicine.org

Trinity Medical Sciences University is an offshore private medical school with its Basic Science part of the MD program, Pre-Medical program and Masters program located in Saint Vincent and the Grenadines in the Caribbean and Clinical Science part of the MD program in Warner Robins, Georgia, United States. It opened in 2008 as a fully accredited medical facility to respond to a shortage of physicians in the United States and Canada. It has its administrative headquarters in Roswell, Georgia, and it partners with Milton Cato Memorial Hospital located in Kingstown and Northwest Hospital in Baltimore.

== Programs ==
=== School of Biomedical Sciences ===
For students who have not attained the four-semester prerequisite courses for entrance to medical school, the school offers undergraduate programs. The Pre-Medical program provides students with 90 credit hours of the basic medical curriculum for those who have not attained applicable credits from foreign universities. Because criteria vary from nation to nation, students who have earned college-level credit previously are recommended to submit those credits for review to confirm their applicability to Trinity's academic requirements.

=== School of Medicine ===
The medical school curriculum is based on the US four-year model, requiring 130 weeks of study. Trinity's program consists of five terms of basic science study, followed by five terms of clinical core and elective clerkships. Students successfully completing the ten terms, which include various NBME subject exams and passing the USMLE Steps 1, 2CK, and 2CS, are awarded a Doctor of Medicine degree.

Because Trinity pays an annual fee for the right to collaborate and co-funds a pediatric surgeon for public-sector practice with Milton Cato Memorial Hospital, students can begin participation in patient care in the first semester of medical school. Students may also support the health officers at the district clinics in Calliaqua and at various health fairs on the island. Clinical clerkships, taking place in years three and four (terms six through ten), are conducted with Trinity faculty and local staff at our network of affiliated hospitals and medical facilities in Baltimore.

=== Health Science program ===
Trinity's Masters of Health Sciences is a degree program for students in the medical field.

== Service culture ==
Trinity Medical Sciences University has healthcare outreach under the umbrella of the school through student activity groups (such as Trinity's AMSA and CaMSA chapters) and reaching out to local children's homes or charity groups on their own. The World Pediatric Project gives high-performing 5th term students an opportunity to assist visiting physicians in the field.

== Accreditation ==
Trinity Medical Sciences University was chartered and licensed in Saint Vincent and the Grenadines on 11 April 2008 and listed in the FAIMER International Medical Education Directory (IMED), now the World Directory of Medical Schools (WDMS), effective 19 September 2008. By virtue of its listing in the WDMS, students graduating from Trinity are authorized to take part in the United States Medical Licensing Examination three-part examinations. Those who pass the examinations are eligible, according to the Educational Commission for Foreign Medical Graduates, to register for and participate in the National Resident Matching Program (NRMP). In July 2015, Trinity Medical Sciences University received CAAM-HP accreditation. In September 2016, CAAM-HP of St. Vincent and the Grenadines was recognized by the United States Department of Education's NCFMEA.

== See also ==
- List of medical schools in the Caribbean
- Medical School
- International medical graduate

== Bibliography ==
- Bosberry-Scott, Wendy (1 October 2010). The John Catt Guide to International Schools 2010/11. Suffolk, England: John Catt Educational Ltd. ISBN 978-1-904724-82-7.
- Rodriguez, Michael; Williamson, Taylor; Vogus, Abigail; Macgregor-Skinner, Elizabeth; Pena, Donna-Lisa; Wilson, Anneke; Nakhimovsky, Sharon (February 2012). "Saint Vincent and the Grenadines Health System and Private Sector Assessment" (PDF). USAID Health Systems 20/20 Project. Bethesda, Maryland: ABT Associates, Inc.
