= List of universities in Bonaire =

This is a list of universities in Bonaire.

== Universities ==
- Augusta Bouwkundig Adviesbureau
- Avalon University School of Medicine - Bonaire campus
- Saint James School of Medicine - Bonaire campus

== See also ==
- List of universities by country
