= List of universities in Aruba =

This is a list of universities in Aruba.

== Universities ==
- American University School of Medicine Aruba
- Aureus University School of Medicine
- Bay University School of Medicine
- University of Aruba
- Xavier University School of Medicine
- Instituto Pedagogico Arubano (IPA)
- Academy for Justice and Security Aruba

== See also ==
- List of universities by country
