= List of universities in Sint Maarten =

This is a list of universities in Sint Maarten.

== Universities ==
- American University of the Caribbean
- American University of Integrative Sciences
- University of St. Martin

== See also ==
- List of universities by country
