= Xusom =

Xusom or XUSOM may represent the Xavier University School of Medicine:

- Xavier University School of Medicine, Aruba, Aruba
- Xavier University School of Medicine, Bonaire
