= Atlantic University (disambiguation) =

Atlantic University is an American private non-profit distance education institution of higher and continuing education in Virginia Beach, Virginia.

Atlantic University may also refer to:

- Atlantic Technological University, a university in north-west Ireland
- Atlantic University Alliance, an association of three universities on the Atlantic coast of Ireland
- Atlantic University (Puerto Rico), a private digital arts university in Guaynabo, Puerto Rico, formerly known as Atlantic University College
- Atlantic University School Of Medicine, a former offshore private medical school located in the Caribbean
- Atlantic University Sport, a regional membership association for universities in Atlantic Canada
- Atlantic International University, a distance-learning university in Hawaii originally incorporated as Atlantic University
