= Destiny University =

Offshore private medical school in Saint Lucia

Coordinates: 13.731037°N 60.941945°W

Destiny University School of Medicine and Health Sciences
- Established: 2001
- Location: Rodney Bay, Saint Lucia
- Website: comhssl.net/casa/

Destiny University (Destiny University School of Medicine and Health Sciences) was an offshore private medical school located in Rodney Bay, Saint Lucia (formerly called the College of Medicine and Health Sciences St. Lucia from its founding in 2001 until 2008). The school's offshore office was located in Butte, Montana. It began operations in 2001 as the College of Medicine and Health Sciences, St. Lucia, under which name it operated until 2008. Then it re-opened at 2013 still as the College of Medicine and Health Sciences, St. Lucia. The Destiny Group of Companies intended to build a new facility for the university in Vieux Fort, which would be fully operational by 2010. When the school began session in 2008, it was functioning as a "distance learning university" in the former Sandy Beach Hotel. The school operated until 2013, at which time it temporarily ceased operations and it re-opened that same year.

== Accreditation ==
The school had been approved to operate by the government of St. Lucia on 17 December 2009. It was accredited by the Caribbean Accreditation Authority for Education in Medicine and other Health Professions (CAAM-HP). The school was listed in the FAIMER International Medical Education Directory (IMED) effective in 2001, and as Destiny from 2008 to 2013, as College of Medicine and Health Sciences from 2013 Till date with school ID #F0001374 and in the World Health Organization's World Directory of Medical Schools. By virtue of its listing in IMED, students who graduated from Destiny between 2008 and 2013, and from College of Medicine and Health Sciences are authorized to take part in the United States Medical Licensing Examination three-part examinations. Those who pass the examinations are eligible according to the Educational Commission for Foreign Medical Graduates to register for and participate in the National Resident Matching Program (NRMP).
