= Offshore medical school =

An offshore medical school is a medical school that caters "primarily to foreign (American and Canadian citizens) students, wishing to practice medicine in the US and Canada" according to the World Bank, compared to local schools that focus on their home nation. Such schools are chiefly located in the Caribbean basin, but also includes schools in other locations, such as Mexico (Universidad Autónoma de Guadalajara School of Medicine) and Australia (University of Queensland Ochsner program), which run programs that target American students.

== Education ==
Offshore medical schools often specialize in the Medical Doctor degree, while US and Canadian medical schools are often departments of universities that offer several degrees. The curriculum of offshore medical schools in the Caribbean aligns with that of the US, as usually only two years of basic science study are offered, and students visit teaching hospitals or clinics in the US, Canada, or the UK for clinical training.

The teachings often focus on the United States Medical Licensing Examination (USMLE) and the Educational Commission for Foreign Medical Graduates (ECFMG) certification process, and the measurement of performance is the passing rate of students in the exams. In most schools, passing of the USMLE Step 2 exam is required to graduate and get a M.D. degree.

In most schools, the academic calendar is divided into 3 academic terms per year, with semesters starting in January, May and September. The lack of a summer break offers students a potentially faster route than US medical schools to a degree with a compressed curriculum.

== Student body ==
Caribbean offshore medical schools have less than 5% local students; the rest are mainly from North America. Students are also relatively older than their North America counterparts. As of 2004, the average ages in schools are 27–30 years old, and half of them are nurses, paramedics, physician assistants, etc. on their second career. Whether a school has state board accreditation or is recognized by loan programs appear to have great influence on the number of applicants, and the effect is seen in the size of student body. Between 1993 and 2007, the mean age of first time ECFMG certification exam applicants from Caribbean offshore medical schools was 29.5 years, and 38% of the applicants were female. The passing rate were 57.4% for the USMLE Step 1 but results varies wildly by country.

== Accreditation and recognition ==
There is no central authority for accreditation as rules and regulations in many Caribbean countries differ greatly. CAAM-HP is a local accreditation body, while ACCM, based in Ireland, is invited by some countries to accredit on their behalf.

The Medical Board of California recognizes only four offshore medical schools in the Caribbean as providing medical education that is equivalent to American schools: St. George's University School of Medicine, Ross University School of Medicine, American University of the Caribbean School of Medicine, Saba University School of Medicine. The California list of recognized schools is used by boards of medicine from several U.S. states (e.g. Colorado, Oregon, Indiana and Tennessee). Texila American University, one of the Caribbean medical schools located in Guyana, is not directly approved by the Medical Board of California; however, it meets California’s ECFMG-aligned criteria, making its graduates eligible for residency and licensure in the state.

The New York Department of Education maintains a list of the schools that have been approved to allow students to complete more than 12 weeks of clinical clerkships in New York State. As of 2021, it included:

- American University of Antigua, Antigua (June 2006)
- American University of the Caribbean, Cupecoy, Sint Maarten (March 2003)
- The Autonomous University of Guadalajara, Guadalajara, Mexico (March 2000)
- English Language Program, University of Debrecen, Medical and Health Science Center, Medical School, Debrecen, Hungary (December 2005)
- English Language Program, Medical University of Lublin, Lublin, Poland (September 1999)
- English Language Program, Medical University of Silesia, Katowice, Poland (June 2000)
- Fatima College of Medicine, Manila, Philippines (June 1988)
- International Health and Medicine Program, Ben Gurion University of the Negrev, Beer-Sheva, Israel (February 2002)
- Kasturba Medical College, Manipal, India (April 2005)
- Medical University of the Americas/Nevis, Nevis, West Indies (March 2006)
- Ross University School of Medicine, Bridgetown, Barbados (October 1999)
- Saba University School of Medicine, The Bottom, Saba (August 2005)
- St. George's University School of Medicine, St. George's, Grenada (January 1987)
- St. Matthew's University School of Medicine, Grand Cayman, Cayman Islands (April 2004)
- Technion Israel Institute of Technology - Technion American Medical Students Program (TEAMS), Haifa, Israel (July 2014)
- The University of Queensland, Brisbane, Australia (March, 2017)
- Xavier University School of Medicine, Oranjestad, Aruba (July, 2020)

== Admissions ==
While admission to American medical schools is highly competitive, standards are generally lower for offshore medical schools. Thus, more American graduates with less than stellar resumes are accepted. The challenge for most of these students is graduating and matching into residency programs in the United States.

== History ==
In the 1970s, American entrepreneurs, noticing high demand for medical education not being met by US schools, started the business of training North American students in offshore universities in the Caribbean. Caribbean countries were selected to locate these medical schools due to the less demanding regulatory environment compared to the United States or Canada. In the late 1970s, three schools were started: St. George's University School of Medicine (Grenada, 1976), Ross University School of Medicine (Dominica, 1978, later moved to Barbados), American University of the Caribbean (Montserrat, 1978, later moved to Sint Maarten). Since then, there has been a steep increase in the number of offshore medical universities (see table below).

The increasing number of schools has both positive and negative effects. On one hand, low initial cost in establishment increased competition, that in turn increases the quality of service. On the other hand, this created a big demand in clinical rotations that even the large states have problem accommodating, let alone their home country, and draw attention from US and Canada auditors who are concerned over public loan use.

New Offshore Caribbean Medical Schools by Decade 1970s-2010s
| Year | Number of New Schools (still operational) | Countries |
|---|---|---|
| 1970s | 3 | Barbados, Dominica, Montserrat |
| 1980s | 3 | Antigua and Barbuda, Dominican Republic, Saint Lucia |
| 1990s | 9 | Anguilla (UK), Barbados, Belize, Cuba, Guyana, Saba (NL), Saint Kitts and Nevis, Saint Vincent and the Grenadines |
| 2000s | 19 | Antigua and Barbuda, Aruba (NL), Belize, Cayman Islands (UK), Curacao (NL), Dominica, Guyana, Montserrat (UK), Saint Kitts and Nevis, Saint Lucia, Saint Vincent and the Grenadines |
| 2010s | 23 | Antigua and Barbuda, Aruba (NL), Barbados, Curacao (NL), Guyana, Jamaica, Montserrat (UK), Saint Kitts and Nevis, Saint Lucia, Saint Vincent and the Grenadines |

== Local impact ==
Nonetheless, the local economies often benefit from the academic and economic influence from those schools. Instead of getting research grants and local government funds, offshore schools often depend on wealthy students from out of country. The spending by foreign students and faculty, as well as increased local employment is a significant factor in the local economy. When schools grow, they often do construction on campus, which increase demand for material and instruments. The local healthcare industry also receive financial and educational help from offshore schools in exchange of clinical experience of students.

== Impact of offshore medical school on the United States of America ==
As an example of the significance of offshore medical schools, in 2007, two such schools—St. George's University School of Medicine and Ross University— had more graduates (1,644 and 1,591, respectively) in Accreditation Council for Graduate Medical Education (ACGME) accredited residency programs than any American medical school. Five offshore Caribbean medical schools combined for 73% of the total number of international students entering family medicine residencies in the United States of America according to the Society of Teachers of Family Medicine: Ross University School of Medicine, St. George’s University School of Medicine, American University of the Caribbean School of Medicine, American University of Antigua College of Medicine, and Saba University School of Medicine. A study conducted in 2019, indicated that international medical graduates account for 23.8% of the family medicine workforce, of those one third attended medical school in the Caribbean, and more than 25% attended off-shore Caribbean medical schools. Moreover, these medical schools have been credited to produce a significant portion of the primary care specialists who work in medically underserved and low income areas.

== See also ==
- List of medical schools in the Caribbean
