= American University of Integrative Sciences =

Offshore medical school in Barbados

American University of Integrative Sciences, School of Medicine
- Former names: University of Sint Eustatius School of Medicine
- Motto: Healing the World, One Student at a Time, One Dream at a Time
- Type: Private, medical school
- Established: 1999
- President: Renu Agnihotri
- Provost: Don Penney
- Dean: Alexey Podcheko
- Academic staff: 15+
- Administrative staff: 25+
- Students: 300+
- Location: Tucker, Georgia; 18.034668°N 63.085218°W
- Campus: Barbados
- Website: www.auis.edu

The American University of Integrative Sciences (AUIS), is a private for-profit offshore medical school with a single campus located in Barbados. Founded in 1999, it was formerly known as the University of Sint Eustatius School of Medicine (USESOM). For a period, the school was based in Sint Maarten, where it was taken over by IEMR LLC, a US-based company. Since October 2017, AUIS has operated in Barbados, and it is currently a candidate for accreditation by the Caribbean Accreditation Authority for Education in Medicine and other Health Professions (CAAM-HP).

== History ==
The school was founded in 1999 as the University of Sint Eustatius School of Medicine, by a group of educators and administrators including Dr. David Gill, former president of St. Christopher's College of Medicine.

With the island of Sint Eustatius becoming part of the Caribbean Netherlands in 2010, the University of Sint Eustatius School of Medicine was required to seek accreditation from the Accreditation Organisation of the Netherlands and Flanders (NVAO). In November 2008, the university's doctor of medicine (M.D.) program was assessed with unsatisfactory results. In 2011, the school was given a two-year extension, but failed to attain NVAO accreditation by the deadline of September 2013. As a result, the University of Sint Eustatius was not allowed to continue operating in the Caribbean Netherlands. At the time, the school was run by Michael Knopf and his daughter, Irene Weinstein.

In September 2013, the school relocated operations to Cole Bay on the Caribbean island of Sint Maarten, and eventually went bankrupt, with a debt of $700,000. By September 2014, it was owned and operated by IEMR, LLC, led by CEO Milo Pinckney, and changed its name to the American University of Integrative Sciences, Sint Maarten School of Medicine (AUIS). According to an AUIS press release, Pinckney appointed Renu Agnihotri, M.D., a former professor of molecular medicine, as president of AUIS. A journal article in BMC Medical Education noted that AUIS St. Maarten School of Medicine marketed itself on its website as providing an alternative for pre-med students who might otherwise "miss out" on their dream of becoming a physician, due to the competitiveness of American and Canadian medical schools.

In March 2017, the AUIS went public with its dispute with Education Minister Silveria Jacobs, accusing her of "stonewalling" and refusing to meet with Pinckney to resolve their differences. According to Agnihotri, the Sint Maarten Ministry of Education had refused to simply change the name on its charter agreement from USESOM to AUIS; instead, it sent AUIS a new charter agreement with different conditions. Agnihotri also criticized Jacobs for discrediting AUIS by stating that it was unaccredited, since the school was in the process of seeking accreditation with the ACCM (Accreditation Commission of Colleges of Medicine). Pinckney told the Today newspaper that he believed a competitor, American University of the Caribbean, had influenced the government to create "obstacles" making it difficult for AUIS to do business in St. Maarten.

By October 2017, the American University of Integrative Sciences had relocated to Barbados.

== Accreditation ==
As of February 2021, the American University of Integrative Sciences is an applicant for "Candidacy status " as a preliminary step for accreditation by the CAAM-HP (Caribbean Accreditation Authority for Education in Medicine and other Health Professions), pending a full site visit.

== Residency placements and training appointments ==
Graduates from the American University of Integrated Sciences have successfully secured residency placements in the United States as well as Canada. Graduates from 2014- 2020 matched into Family Medicine, Internal Medicine, Psychiatry and other specialties.

== See also ==
- Offshore medical school
- International medical graduate
- List of medical schools in the Caribbean
