= St. Matthew's University =

For-profit Cayman Islands university

Coordinates: 19°20′23″N 81°22′44″W

- Established: School of Medicine: 1997 School of Veterinary Medicine: 2005
- President: Cyndi McLeod, MBA
- Dean: Medical School: Maribel Aurelio, MD (Basic Science); Jon Hojnoski, MD (Clinical Science). Veterinary School: Brendan Lee, DVM (Executive Dean); Samantha Shields, DVM (Dean)
- Location: West Bay Road, Seven Mile Beach, Grand Cayman, Cayman Islands
- Website: stmatthews.edu

St. Matthew's University (SMU) is a private medical school located on Grand Cayman, Cayman Islands in the Caribbean. SMU has a School of Medicine and a School of Veterinary Medicine, which confer Doctor of Medicine (MD) and Doctor of Veterinary Medicine (DVM) degrees, respectively. St. Matthew's University is owned by Global University Systems, which also owns Saba University School of Medicine and Medical University of the Americas.

== History ==
St. Matthew's University was established in 1997 on the island of Ambergris Caye, Belize, by physician Dr. Michael Harris. In 2002, the university relocated its campus and operations to Grand Cayman in the Cayman Islands.

Following its relocation, the university expanded its academic scope by establishing the School of Veterinary Medicine in 2005. In 2021, the institution was acquired by the corporate education group Global University Systems (GUS), which manages its current financial and strategic operations.

== Curriculum ==
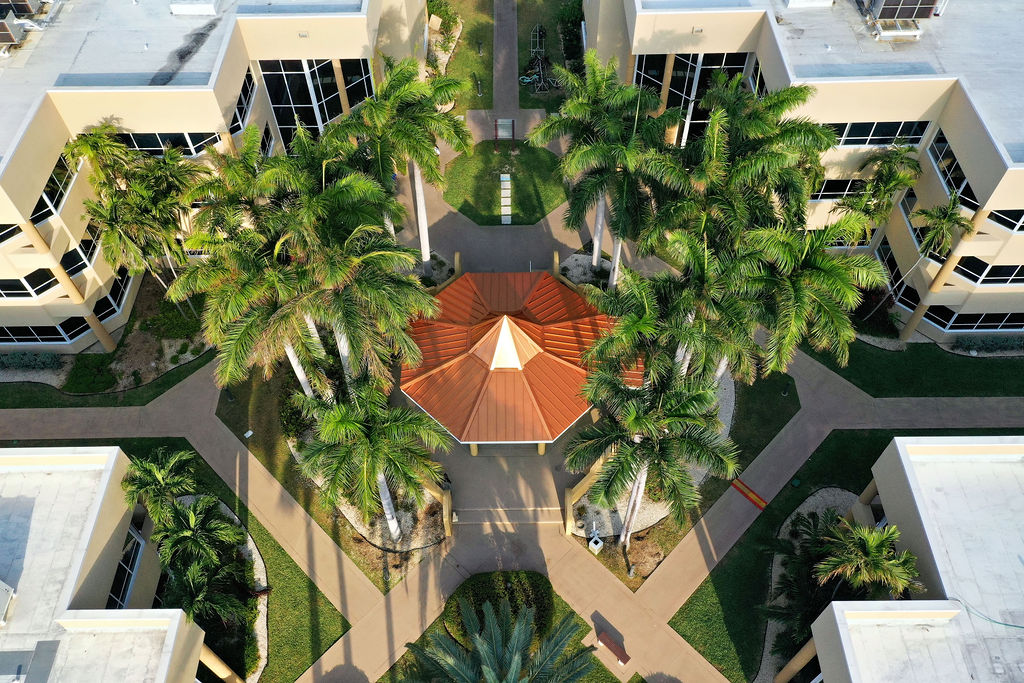
St. Matthews University Campus - Aerial Perspective

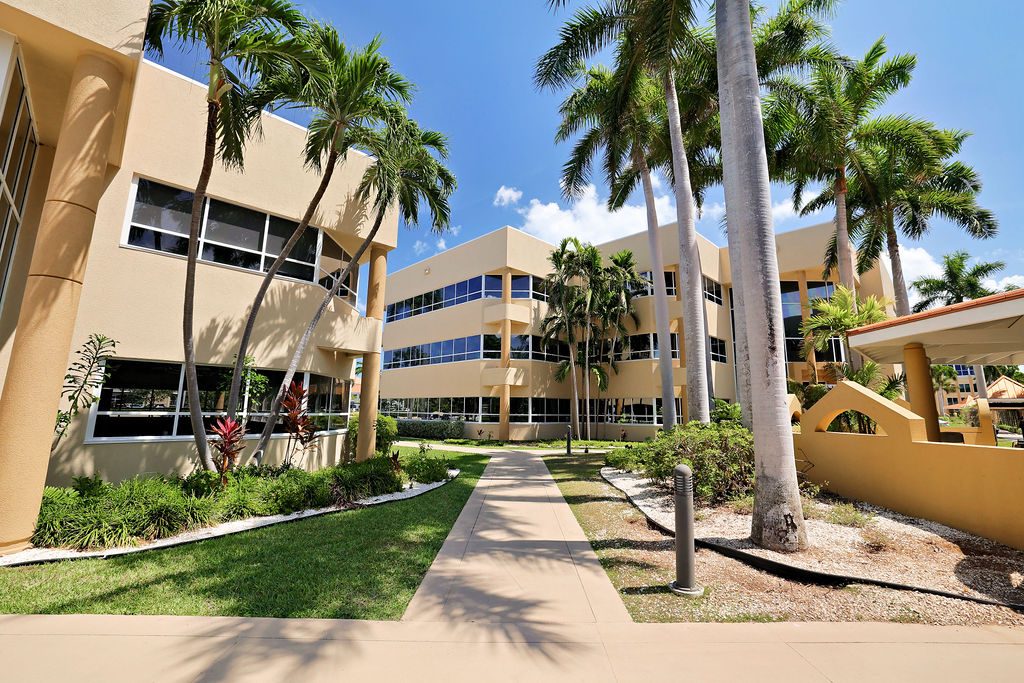
St Matthews University Campus

The SMU MD program encompasses 10 total semesters, divided evenly between Basic Science and Clinical Medicine. Students in the Basic Science program spend two years on the island of Grand Cayman, learning in classroom and lab-based settings. Students in the Clinical Medicine portion undertake clinical rotations at associated teaching hospitals, clinics and medical centers in the U.S. (including ACGME-approved locations), and at select elect rotation sites in Canada.

The DVM program also features 10 semesters, with students spending seven semesters in veterinary Basic Science on SMU's island campus, and three semesters in veterinary Clinical Medicine. DVM students have the option to undertake rotations at an affiliated veterinary college in the U.S. or Canada, where they work alongside fourth-year veterinary students.

== Campus and Facilities ==
The main university campus is situated in the West Bay area of Grand Cayman. The campus features modern academic infrastructure, including lecture halls, research facilities, a gross anatomy laboratory, and a specialized Clinical Skills Laboratory designed to simulate real-world hospital environments. Students also utilize local medical and community facilities on the island for early patient interaction.

== Accreditation and Recognition ==
=== School of Medicine ===
The St. Matthew's University School of Medicine (SMUSOM) is accredited by the Accreditation Commission on Colleges of Medicine (ACCM), which is recognized by the World Federation of Medical Education (WFME). Its standards have been deemed comparable to the standards used to accredit medical schools in the United States by the U.S. Department of Education’s National Committee on Foreign Medical Education and Accreditation (NCFMEA).

SMUSOM is one of the few international medical schools with approvals in the key U.S. states of New York and Florida. These states mandate regular institutional reviews and approvals prior to granting access to clerkship and licensing opportunities in their respective states, and other states rely on these approvals for the purposes of licensure.

SMUSOM MD program students from the U.S. and Canada are eligible to participate in relevant government student loan programs. SMUSOM is approved for U.S. Federal Loans.

=== School of Veterinary Medicine ===
St. Matthew’s University School of Veterinary Medicine (SMUSVM) is listed with the American Veterinary Medical Association (AVMA) and is a Member Institution of the American Association of Veterinary Medical Colleges (AAVMC).

== See also ==
- Medical School
- Global University Systems
- International medical graduate
- List of medical schools in the Caribbean
