= Accreditation Commission of Colleges of Medicine =

The Accreditation Commission on Colleges of Medicine (ACCM) is an international medical review and accreditation agency service for medical schools.

The National Committee on Foreign Medical Education and Accreditation (NCFMEA), part of the United States Department of Education, has listed ACCM as "found to use standards to accredit their medical schools that are comparable to the standards used to accredit medical schools in the United States."

In 2017 ACCM was granted a 10-year recognition by the World Federation on Medical Education (WFME)

== Operation ==
The ACCM works on behalf of the governments in relation to medical school standards in the following Caribbean countries and one middle Eastern country and according to its site there is only one ACCM accredited medical school in each of the countries:.

Country	School	First accredited	Current status
Curacao	Avalon University School of Medicine	2019	Accredited until May 31, 2022
Guyana	Texila American University	2023	Accredited until June 30, 2029
Commonwealth of Dominica	All Saints University School of Medicine	2019	Accredited until May 31, 2022
Aruba	Xavier University School of Medicine	2015	Accredited until May 31, 2025
Anguilla, and Saint Vincent and the Grenadines	Saint James School of Medicine	2019	Accredited until May 31, 2022
Cayman Islands	St. Matthew's University	2001	Accredited until June 30, 2025
Nevis	Medical University of the Americas	2007	Accredited until May 31, 2022
Saint Kitts	University of Medicine and Health Sciences	2015	Accredited until May 31, 2021, and extended due to Covid to Nov 30, 2021
Saint Maarten	American University of the Caribbean	1995	Accredited until December 31, 2021
Jordan	Medical Programme at the University of Jordan	2016	Accredited until May 31, 2022

As of 2020, various schools (Aureus University School of Medicine in Aruba, Arabian Gulf University (AGU) in Bahrain and Jordan University of Science & Technology in Jordan) were pending onsite full accreditation inspection which would be scheduled after travel restrictions associated with the COVID-19 global pandemic were removed.

== See also ==
- List of medical schools in the Caribbean
- Caribbean Accreditation Authority for Education in Medicine and other Health Professions
