= ACCM =

ACCM may refer to:

- Accreditation Commission of Colleges of Medicine, an international medical review and accreditation agency service for medical schools
- Advisory Council for the Church's Ministry, a part of the Church of England Archbishops' Council
