= Georgetown American University =

Healthcare university in Guyana

Coordinates: 6°48′24″N 58°9′18″W

- Type: Private
- Established: November 2013; 12 years ago
- Officer in charge: Melissa Varswyk
- Chairman: Cyril Fox
- Language: English
- Colors: Burgundy, orange, yellow
- Website: www.gau.edu.gy
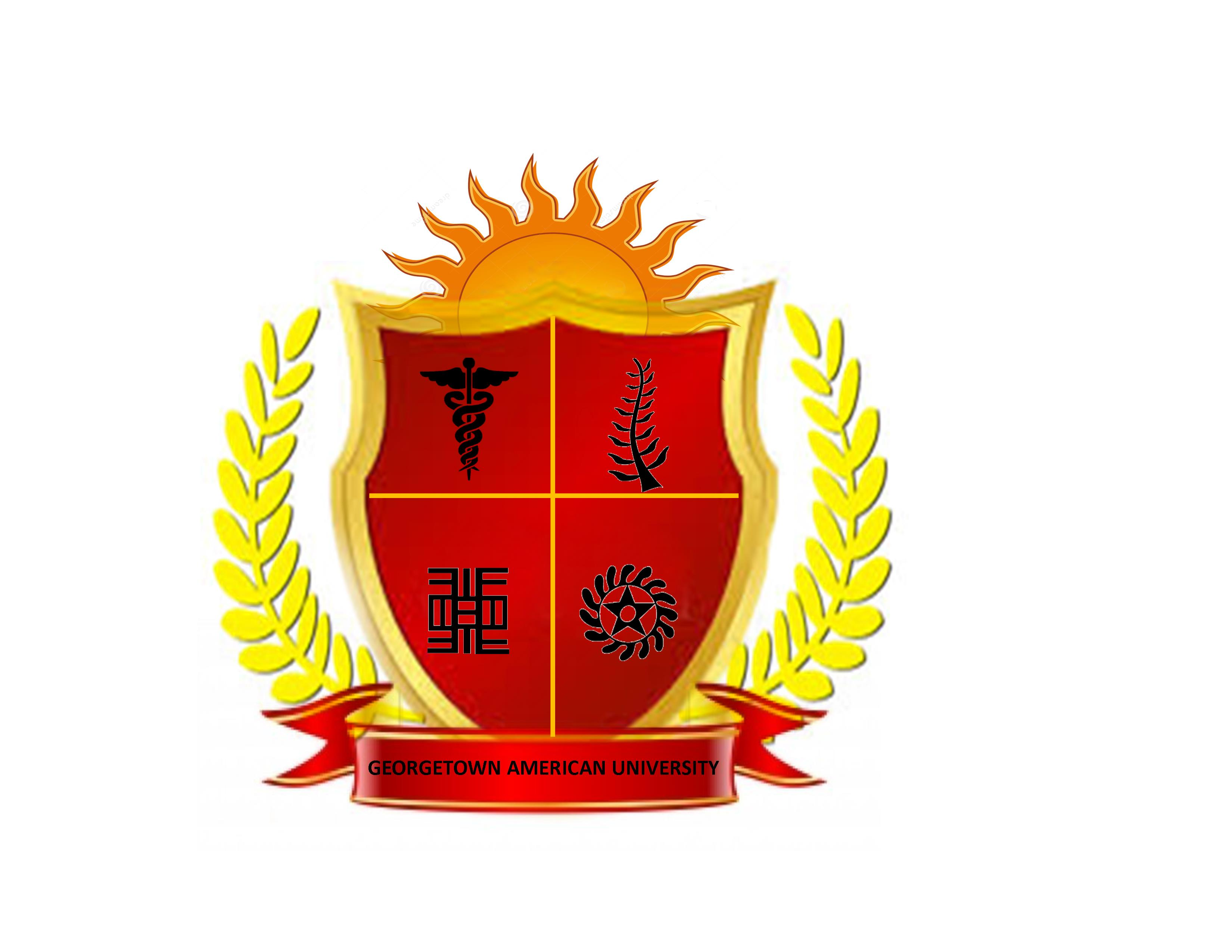

Georgetown American University is a private healthcare-oriented university in Georgetown, Guyana established in 2013.

The first students enrolled in June 2014, and their first graduation was 2018.

== Accreditation ==
GAU is registered with the National Accreditation Council of Guyana. It is listed in FAIMER International Medical Education Directory (IMED) and World Directory of Medical Schools. The university is certified International Standard Organisation (ISO) 9001-2015 compliant for producing Medical Professionals and Emergency Technicians.

== Programs offered ==
GAU currently offers the following programs:

- Doctor of Medicine - 4-year program
- Associate of Science in Premedical Sciences
- Associate of Science in Nursing
- Bachelor of Science in Nursing
- Associate of Science Degree in Cybersecurity
- Bachelor of Science in Cybersecurity

== Affiliations ==
The university is affiliated with the hospitals and medical training institutions in Guyana and the USA. A list is provided below:

- Wyckoff Hospital - Brooklyn, New York
- Piedmont Eastside Medical Center, Snellville, GA
- Caribbean Heart Institute - Georgetown
- Georgetown Public Hospital, Georgetown

== Location ==
GAU main Campus is in Guyana, South America offices in the United States:

- Guyana Campus - 81 Croal Street, Georgetown Guyana
- Clinical Sciences Office - 1 West Court Square, Suite 763, Decatur, GA 30030, USA
- Information Office USA - 17927 Shotley Bridge Place, Olney, Maryland 20832 USA

== See also ==
- International medical graduate
- List of medical schools in the Caribbean
