= Universidad Tecnológica de Santiago =

Private University in the Dominican Republic

- Motto: Conocimiento y Experiencia (Spanish)
- Motto in English: Knowledge and Experience
- Type: Private
- Established: November 12, 1974; 51 years ago
- President: Príamo Rodríguez
- Location: Campuses are located in Santiago de los Caballeros, Santo Domingo, Puerto Plata, Moca, Santa Cruz de Mao and Dajabón, Dominican Republic
- Campus: Santiago main campus, Urban, 0.10 km^{2}; Santo Domingo campus, Urban; Puerto Plata campus, Urban; Moca campus, Urban; Mao campus, Urban; Dajabón campus, Urban
- Colors: Green, Yellow and White
- Website: Official website

The Universidad Tecnológica de Santiago (UTESA), or Santiago University of Technology, is the largest private university of the Dominican Republic with more than 50,000 active students and over 150,000 alumni. Its main campus is in the city of Santiago de los Caballeros, and it has other campus extensions in Santo Domingo, Puerto Plata, Moca, Dajabón, Santa Cruz de Mao and Gaspar Hernández. It was founded on November 12, 1974, by a group of professionals, and is one of the main research institutes in the country.

== History ==
The Technological University of Santiago (UTESA) is the result of the interpretation of a group of professionals who envisioned the need for a new educational order at a time when the country needed a qualified staff in technical and professional areas. In response to these needs, aided by the Foundation Board and its Academic Regulations, the November 12, 1974 begins its formal this educational institution, acquiring legal personality on April 19, 1976, through Executive Order No. 1944.

UTESA was the first private university in the Dominican Republic to offer a night time.

On June 17, 1978, by Decree 3432 of the Executive Branch is authorized to issue academic degrees with the same force and effect as those of other officials or independent institutions of equal status.

In 1979, responding to new demands, expanding its curricular offerings, for the development of the career of Health Sciences, with the advice of American Universities of Ohio, South Carolina and Grenada.

To achieve the purposes defined in the academic programs, the university integrates the national and international organizations that bring together higher education institutions in the region and globally which stand between the Dominican Association of Universities (Adou), Caribbean Universities (UNICA), the Union of Latin American Universities (UDUAL), the Pan American Association of Universities, The American University Council for Economic and Social Development (CARE), The Ibero-American University Postgraduate Association (AUIP), The International Association of University Presidents (IAUP), among others.

Since 1992, expanding its curricular offerings UTESA starting the School of Engineering and Technology that operates at the headquarters of Santiago de los Caballeros and extensions in Santo Domingo and Puerto Plata.

In 1996, it signed an agreement with the University of Houston–Clear Lake with which begins the international academic program 2+2.

=== Controversy ===
In July 1985, the Medical Board of California in the United States of America permanently disapproved the UTESA School of Medicine following an extensive review of its programs and faculty. The school attempted to obtain a probationary status, however, the disapproval was ratified in 1986 and again in 1997. The school has since been included in the disapproved list of several other U.S. states, including: Kansas, Indiana and Tennessee. However, medical graduates from the school are able to be licensed as physicians by these medical boards with endorsement from a primary medical board. Graduates from this medical school practice in all 50 States.

== Faculties ==
The university has various faculties, which include:

- Architecture and Engineering
- Health Sciences
- Economics and Social Sciences
- Secretarial Sciences
- Sciences and Humanities
- Graduate School

== Philosophy ==
The Technological University of Santiago was founded to promote democratic principles, promote national and universal culture, provide alternatives and solutions to national problems, to provide timely service to communicate locally and internationally. Being a humanist Open University, offers ample opportunities at all levels and forms of higher education to those aspiring for personal and professional, according to labor market requirements and the level of development of the country's productive forces with the highest standards of quality.

== Academic programs ==
The curricula of different levels, are consistent with the nature that makes up each of the areas, and the number of credits established. An academic credit is the unit equivalent to a theoretical class time or two hours weekly practices. The duration of each program is five years, during which it's developed and evaluated the impact of same in accordance with market requirements.

The restructuring and upgrading of the software is the result of cooperation between Clerk of the Course, teachers in the area, and Planning Advisory Committee, together with the Vice-Rector Academic. The students, upon enrollment, are incorporated into the existing curriculum of the career, which must be approved by the Boards of Directors and Academic.
