= Medical University of the Americas – Nevis =

Private for-profit offshore medical school in Charlestown, Nevis

Coordinates: 17°11′37″N 62°33′39″W

Medical University of the Americas
- Motto: Educating and Training Future Physicians and Healthcare Leaders
- Type: Medical School
- Established: 1998
- President: Cyndi McLeod, MBA
- Dean: Brenda Roman, MD
- Location: Nevis
- Website: www.mua.edu

Medical University of the Americas (MUA) is a private medical school on the island of Nevis. It is owned by Global University Systems, which also owns Saba University School of Medicine and St. Matthew's University. MUA and Saba are sister schools because they share the same curriculum. MUA offers an internationally accredited MD program that confers upon its graduates the Doctor of Medicine (MD) degree, as well as multiple pre-medical programs.

== Curriculum ==
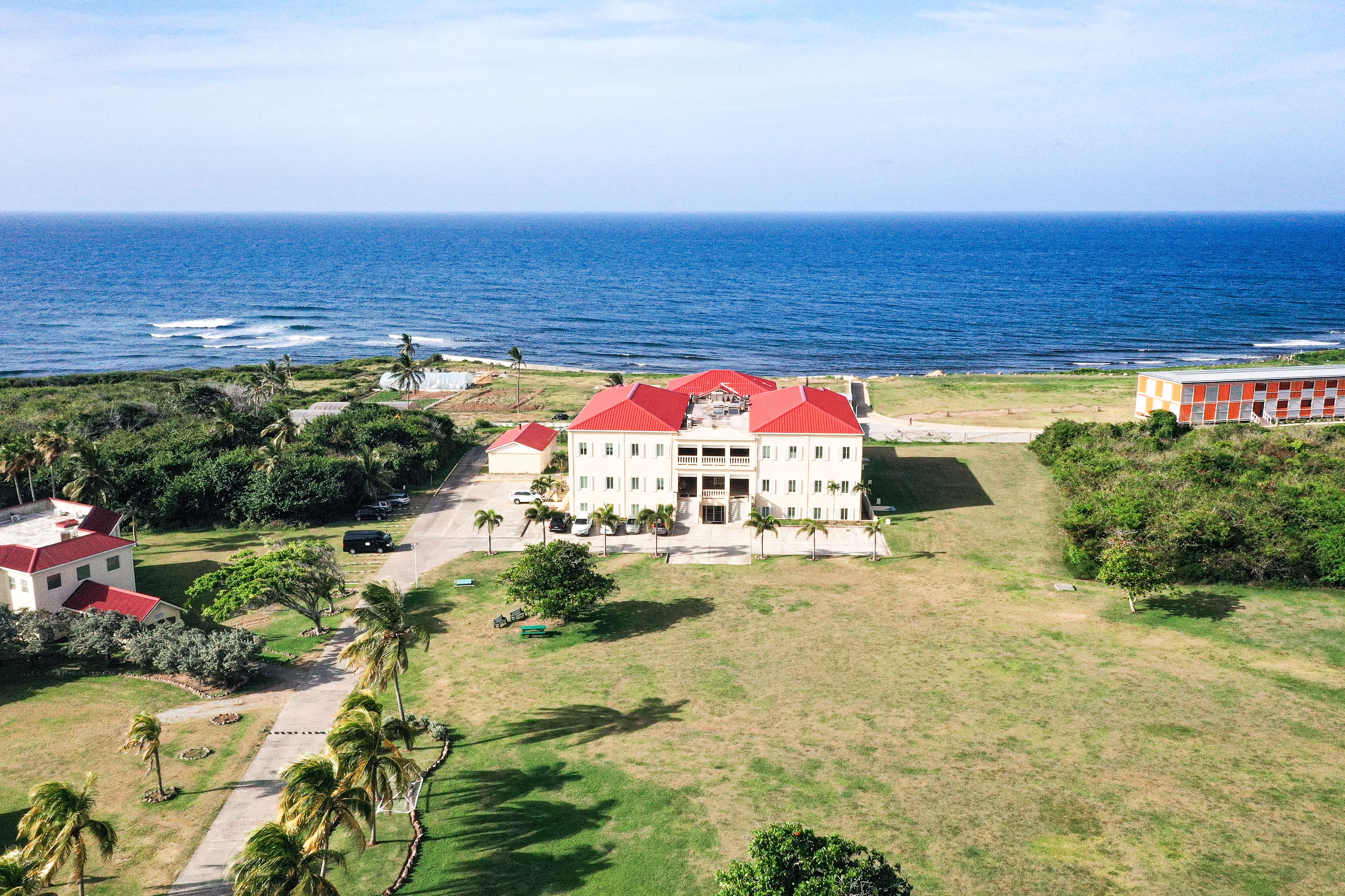
MUA campus

Students in the MD program will spend 20 months (semesters 1-5) on campus in Basic Science, followed by 72 weeks (semesters 6-10) doing clinical rotations in the U.S. (core and electives) and Canada (select electives) during Clinical Medicine. The first two years consist of classroom and lab-based learning. The next two years comprise required and elective rotations at affiliated teaching hospitals, clinics and medical centers (including ACGME-approved sites) in the U.S., and select elective rotation sites in Canada.

After completing Basic Science, MUA requires students to pass the United States Medical Licensing Examination (USMLE) Step 1 prior to starting clinical rotations. After completing rotations, students are required to pass the USMLE Step 2 CK before graduating.

=== Pre-Medical Programs ===
For students that lack the medical education background to proceed directly into the 4-year MD program, MUA offers multiple pre-medical programs for those with different knowledge levels, including:

- Pre-Med Master's Program
- 5-year BSc/MD Program
- 6-Year BSc/MD Program
- Gateway Program

These pre-med programs can be attended virtually or in-person on the MUA campus.

== Accreditation and Approvals ==
The MUA MD program is accredited by the Accreditation Commission of Colleges of Medicine. The MUA pre-medical programs are accredited by the St. Kitts & Nevis Ministry of Education.

MUA is listed in the World Directory of Medical Schools and has received a comparability determination from the National Committee on Foreign Medical Education and Accreditation (NCFMEA).

Medical University of the Americas has been approved to participate in the William D. Ford Federal Direct Unsubsidized Stafford and Grad PLUS Loan programs, which are both administered by the U.S. Department of Education.

On July 27, 2017, Medical Board of California voted to approve and recognize the Medical University of the Americas, Nevis. The approval recognizes credentials of students who matriculated as of May 2015 onward (when a new curriculum was implemented).

MUA is approved by the New York State Education Department for clinical training, residency and licensure in New York. MUA is approved by the New York State Education Department (NYSED) to allow students to complete more than 12 weeks of clinical clerkships in New York State. MUA is one of eight Caribbean medical schools so approved by NYSED.

MUA has received approval by the Commission for Independent Education, Florida Department of Education for licensure.

=== Academic Outcomes ===
According to the U.S. Department of Education, 25% of U.S. medical students (7 out of 28) completed the MD program on time in 2023.

Pass rates of its students and graduates on the United States Medical Licensing Examinations (USMLE) in calendar year 2023 were as follows:
Step 1 – Basic Science: 84.62%
Step 2 – Clinical Knowledge (CK): 96.97%
Step 3 – Clinical Skills (CS) discontinued as of Jan. 26, 2021

For reference, the pass rates among the top 110 ranked medical schools as reported by U.S. News Best Medical Schools rankings in 2019 were as follows:

Step 1 – Basic Science: 96.3%

Step 2 – Clinical Knowledge (CK): 96.6%
