= Atlantic University School of Medicine =

Former medical school in Saint Lucia

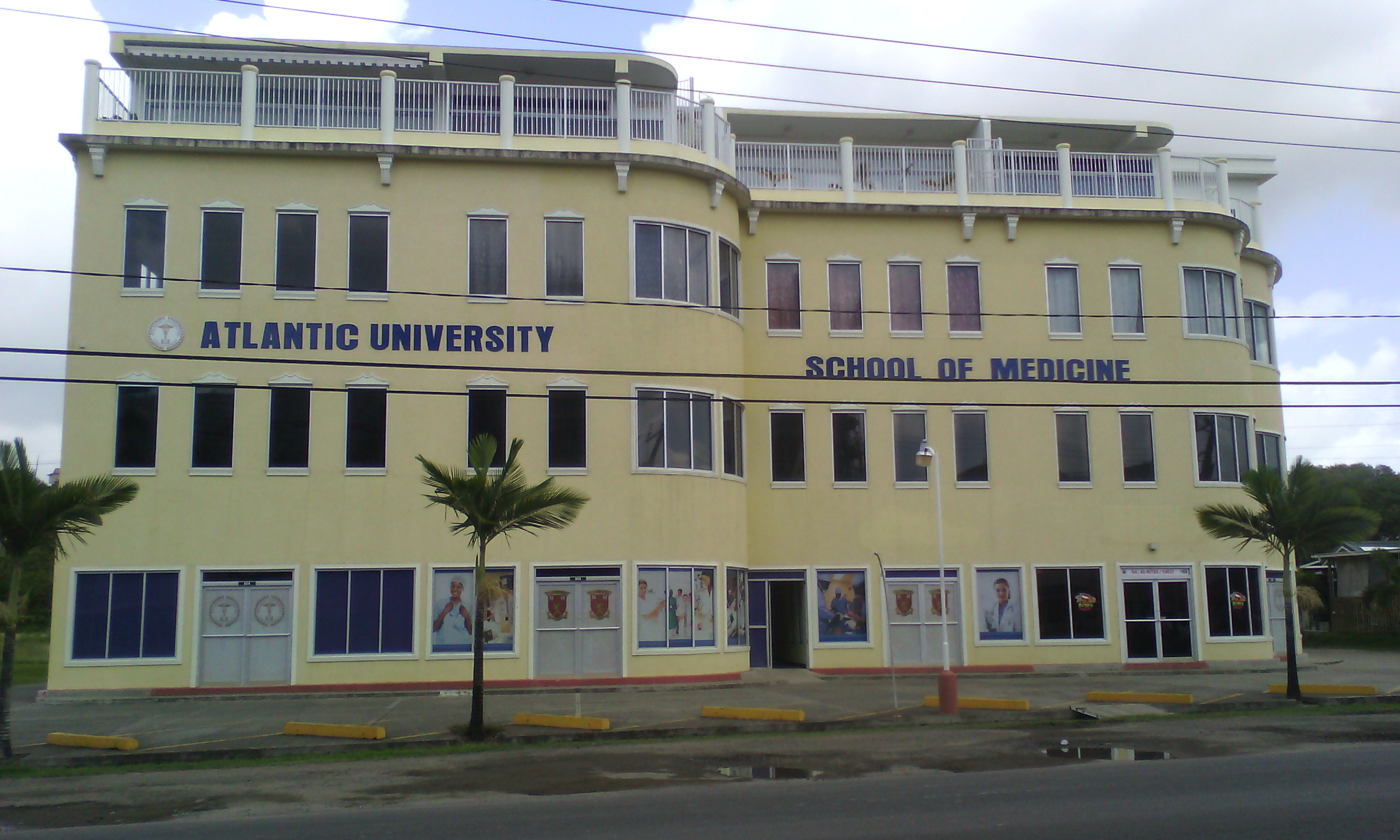
- Atlantic University School of Medicine building in St. Lucia
- Active: 2010–December 2017
- Location: Rodney Bay, Gros Islet, St. Lucia; St. John's, Antigua and Barbuda; 17°07′24″N 61°50′35″W
- Website: ausom.org (archived)

Atlantic University School of Medicine (AUSOM) was an offshore private medical school, located in St. Lucia from its foundation in 2010 until August 2017 and then for 5 months in St. John's, Antigua and Barbuda until December 2017, when it fully closed.

== History ==
Established in 2010 in St. Lucia, AUSOM operated at Rodney Bay, Gros Islet until August 2017. It was housed in part of the St. Lucia National Neurological and Mental Health Wellness Centre, a facility originally constructed by China to serve as a Caribbean regional psychiatric center and completed by Taiwan after the United Workers Party came to power in the 2006 elections; it was the fourth offshore medical school in St. Lucia at the time. Its application was approved by the Cabinet of St. Lucia in 2010, though as of 2014, the country did not have legislation in place for licensing and regulating medical schools. The college had an offshore office located in Island Park, New York.

The St. Lucia Medical and Dental Council set a deadline for AUSOM to show proof of accreditation, as a result of which the college moved in August 2017 to St. John's, Antigua and Barbuda ECFMG then added a statement under "Sponsor Notes": "In 2017, ECFMG determined that certain staff / officials of Atlantic University School of Medicine engaged in irregular behavior in connection with providing false information and documents to ECFMG.".

The college ended its last academic semester in December 2017. Per ECFMG, those students who had completed MD by end of 2017, and those who had transferred out of AUSOM by the end of 2017 and resumed their medical education with another accredited university in 2018, were eligible to apply for USMLE Steps and ECGMG graduation certification upon finishing medical school at another accredited university.. After closure, AUSOM's website remained active for some time. Students who had not graduated with MD by December 2017 had to transfer to other medical schools to complete graduation. Students who had graduated with MD prior to December 2017 were not affected.

== Programs ==
The college accepted both St. Lucian and foreign students, offering a scholarship program for qualified St. Lucian residents.

The primary educational programs at AUSOM were: a two-year premed course of study; a four-year medical curriculum, which led to a Doctor of Medicine degree; and a six-year track that combined the premed and medical training. In addition to theoretical and academic training, students were required to complete 48 weeks of clinical clerkships. Students participated in community health clinics from their first year of study, offering basic health checks, diabetes screenings, and basic eye examinations.

== Accreditation ==
Atlantic University School of Medicine received approval from the St. Lucian Cabinet in 2010. It was not accredited by the Caribbean Accreditation Authority for Education in Medicine and other Health Professions (CAAM-HP). On February 14, 2018, the Antigua Daily Observer printed an article containing claims by AUSOM administrators that the school was now CAAM-HP approved. By December 2017 the school had already closed. On February 19, 2018 CAAM-HP responded with a statement on the Disclaimer section of their website headed "False Claim made in the Antigua Daily Observer about the Accreditation of Atlantic University School of Medicine".

=== United States ===
AUSOM is listed in the FAIMER International Medical Education Directory (IMED) and in the World Health Organization's World Directory of Medical Schools, but as of 1 January 2018, only students and graduates of this medical school with a graduation year of 2017 and earlier are fully eligible for ECFMG Certification and take the United States Medical Licensing Examination.

=== Canada ===
Candidates from Atlantic University School of Medicine and 4 other St Lucia medical schools who graduated on January 1, 2018 or thereafter are not eligible to apply for Medical Council of Canada (MCC) services or for licensure in Canada. This reference from the Canadian Medical Council website shows “Effective today, candidates from five Saint Lucia medical schools who will graduate on January 1, 2018 or thereafter are not eligible to apply for Medical Council of Canada (MCC) services or apply for licensure in Canada. These five schools are:

1. American International Medical University School of Medicine
2. Atlantic University School of Medicine
3. College of Medicine and Health Sciences
4. International American University College of Medicine
5. Washington Medical Sciences Institute.

Candidates who will graduate from these medical schools before January 1, 2018, are still eligible to apply for MCC services and licensure in Canada.”

Graduates from the Atlantic University School of Medicine remained eligible for ECFMG certification in the US and for MCC licensure in Canada since the school became fully closed in December 2017.
