= International University of the Health Sciences =

- Established: 1998
- Dean: Andrew Merry
- Location: Basseterre, Saint Kitts and Nevis; 17.302606°N 62.717692°W
- Website: www.iuhs.edu

International University of the Health Sciences (IUHS) is a private medical school located in Basseterre, Saint Kitts and Nevis. It opened in 1998 with headquarters in Winnipeg, Manitoba, Canada and campus in Basseterre. The school is accredited by the government of St. Kitts & Nevis, listed in the World Health Organization (WHO) World Directory of Medical Schools, and it has been assigned the FAIMER School ID of F0001171.

== Programs ==
Programs are open to both Kittian/Nevisian and foreign students. Both Bachelor of Medicine, Bachelor of Surgery (MBBS) and MDDoctor of Medicine degrees are available. The school has a very high graduation rate and students often complete the program.

=== Premedical program ===
For students who have not obtained the prerequisite undergraduate degree for entrance into the medical school, IUHS offers an MBBS track which provides students with 90 credit hours of basic premedical curriculum.

=== Medical program ===
The school curriculum is based upon the US model, requiring four years of study including both a medical science program followed by clinical practicum. Completion results in a Doctor of Medicine degree.

== Accreditation ==
The International University of the Health Sciences was chartered and licensed in Saint Kitts and Nevis and approved by the country's accreditation process. It is listed in the FAIMER International Medical Education Directory (IMED) effective in 1998. Students graduating from IUHS are authorized to take part in the United States Medical Licensing Examination three-part examinations. Those who pass the examinations are eligible according to the Educational Commission for Foreign Medical Graduates to register for and participate in the National Resident Matching Program (NRMP).
