= Saint James School of Medicine =

Private medical school in Anguilla and Saint Vincent

- Type: Medical school
- Established: 1999
- President: Kallol Guha
- Location: Arnos Vale and Golden Vale, Saint Vincent and the Grenadines
- Campus: 2 acres; Urban
- Website: sjsm.org

Saint James School of Medicine (SJSM) is a private medical school founded in 1999 that offers a Doctor of Medicine (MD) degree. Its main campus is located in Arnos Vale and Golden Vale, Saint Vincent and the Grenadines, and it maintains an administrative office in Park Ridge, Illinois, United States. The school has approximately 1,000 students.

== History ==
Saint James School of Medicine was originally established in Bonaire in 1999 and began instruction in 2000. Kallol Guha is the founder and president. He holds academic degrees from the University of Copenhagen and the University of Kuopio in Finland, and began his career in Caribbean medical education during in the early 1980s.

In 2006, the people of Bonaire, Sint Eustatius and Saba agreed to dissolve the Netherlands Antilles. Upon the imminent dissolution of the country, the ministers of health of the Netherlands and the Netherlands Antilles requested the Accreditation Organisation of the Netherlands and Flanders (NVAO) to assess the quality of all medical schools in the Netherlands Antilles. The medical school on the island of Saba was the only one to hold NVAO accreditation. The rest of the schools decided to relocate their campuses. In 2010, Saint James opened a campus in Anguilla.

In 2014, the School opened its St. Vincent and the Grenadines campus, and began merging the Bonaire campus into the Saint Vincent and the Grenadines campus on the main island of Saint Vincent. At the end of the Fall 2015 semester, Saint James moved its Bonaire operation, students, and faculty to the St. Vincent and the Grenadines campus. They also transferred their IMED listing.

In 2022, the Federal Trade Commission filed a complaint in the U.S. District Court for the Northern District of Illinois alleging that the school and its Illinois-based operators had misrepresented USMLE Step 1 pass rates and residency match rates in marketing materials and sales communications (Case No. 1:22-cv-1919). The complaint cited a brochure advertising a 96.77% first-time Step 1 pass rate, compared with a rate the FTC calculated at about 35%, and alleged an average residency match rate of 63% versus the 83% the school advertised. According to an FTC press release, the school and its Illinois-based operators – will have to pay $1.2 million toward refunds and debt cancellation for students harmed by its deceptive marketing, according to an FTC press release." The school denied these allegations in their statement, saying that they settled to avoid lengthy and expensive legal proceeding with the FTC.

A new campus in Golden Vale, Saint Vincent opened on October 17, 2024, as Phase 1 of a larger construction project. The opening was attended by the Honourable Prime Minister of Saint Vincent and the Grenadines, Dr. Ralph Gonsalves. The new 5,500 sq. ft. facility, along with a 4,000 sq. ft. outdoor amphitheater, marks Phase 1 of a larger 40,000+ sq. ft. campus, which is expected to be completed in 2026.

In 2024, the school consolidated to a single campus in Saint Vincent and the Grenadines, closing its Anguilla location.

== MD program curriculum ==
The MD program at Saint James School of Medicine is a 10-semester course of study, with three semesters per calendar year, each lasting four months. Semesters 1-5 are basic sciences completed at the campus in St. Vincent and the Grenadines. From September 2024, all basic science coursework has been conducted on the school's campus in St. Vincent and the Grenadines. After completion, students are expected to complete the United States Medical Licensing Exam (USMLE) Step 1.

The Clinical Science portion consists of semesters 6-10 that involve 80 weeks of clinical study that are completed at affiliated hospitals and clinical facilities in the United States.

Saint James School of Medicine has a dual MD/MPH pathway with the University of Nebraska Medical Center (UNMC) College of Public Health, allowing MD students to transfer six elective credits toward a UNMC Master of Public Health.

== Accreditation ==
The Accreditation Commission of Colleges of Medicine granted Saint James School of Medicine full accreditation for three years in 2019. Later, in 2022, Saint James received a further three-year full accreditation until December 31, 2025. In May 2025, ACCM announced that the school has renewed its accreditation for another three years. The new approval is scheduled to expire in December 2028.

Saint James School of Medicine's campus is listed in the World Directory of Medical Schools (WDMS). Graduates of Saint James are eligible for the United States Medical Licensing Examination (USMLE) and ECFMG Certification, as well as the Canadian Medical Licensing Exams (Medical Council of Canada Qualifying Examination).

The school participated in the accreditation process of the Caribbean Accreditation Authority for Education in Medicine and other Health Professions (CAAM-HP) from February 2007 until July 2024, when it voluntarily withdrew as part of a broader strategic initiative to align with other recognized accrediting organizations.

The St. Vincent campus is also recognized by the National Accreditation Board (NAB) of the Government of St. Vincent and the Grenadines.

== Financial aid ==
Saint James School of Medicine (SJSM) has entered into an arrangement with Delta Financial Solutions, Inc. (Delta) to provide qualified students with a private student loan program. Saint James School of Medicine is not eligible for United States federal loans.

== Student life ==
Students can join clubs, including an AMSA chapter, a Phi Chi chapter, and others. The student body also volunteers to operate health screenings for the local community.

Notable alumni include Kelley Hurley, a four-time Olympic fencer and 2012 Olympic team bronze medalist, as well as Dawn Zuidgeest-Craft.

== See also ==
- List of medical schools in the Caribbean
