= American International Medical University =

Medical school in St. Lucia

- Motto: Brings health care innovation to serve humanity
- Type: Private
- Established: 2007
- Affiliations: Independent
- Chairman: Mr. Evans Calderon
- Vice-president: Mr. Urban Dolor
- Faculty: 73
- Administrative staff: 110
- Location: Gros Islet, Saint Lucia; 14°04′39″N 60°56′23″W
- Website: aimu.us

American International Medical University (AIMU) is an offshore medical school located on the Caribbean island of St. Lucia. It operates a School of Medicine and a School of Nursing. It partners with universities and hospitals in the United States including Washington Adventist University (WAU) in Takoma Park, Maryland, to offer independent support programs and offers joint classes with WAU for the AIM-U Premedical Science Program on the WAU campus.

AIM-U's curriculum and academic programs are prepared and monitored by Members / Specialists of Medical Councils, including Medical School Accreditation Approval and Monitoring Committee, ECFMG.

== Accreditation ==
American International Medical University is listed in the FAIMER International Medical Education Directory (IMED) effective in 2007 with school ID #F0002364 and in the World Health Organization's World Directory of Medical Schools. By virtue of its listing in IMED, students graduating from AAIMS are authorized to take part in the United States Medical Licensing Examination three-part examinations. Those who pass the examinations are eligible according to the Educational Commission for Foreign Medical Graduates to register for and participate in the National Resident Matching Program (NRMP).
