= Caribbean Medical University =

Medical School

Coordinates: 12.110139°N 68.949361°W

- Type: Private, For-Profit, Medical School
- Established: 2007
- Dean: Dr. Ali M. Ayubi MD. MSc. DMSc.
- Location: Willemstad, Curaçao, Kingdom of the Netherlands,
- Website: www.cmumed.org

Caribbean Medical University (CMU) is an independent, for-profit, U.S. curriculum-based medical school. It is located on the island of Curaçao in the southern Caribbean Sea, off the Venezuelan coast. The main campus is located in the Piscadera Bay area of Willemstad. After a total of four years of training, students are awarded the degree of Doctor of Medicine (M.D.).

== Overview ==
Founded in 2007, CMU enrolls classes three times a year: January, May, and September, with an average class size of 45 students. Students complete their Basic Science education on the island in four semesters at the World Trade Center Curaçao. After completing the 4th semester, students study for and sit for the USMLE Step 1 exam, and then continue on to 6 semesters of clinical clerkships at teaching hospitals throughout the United States. Upon completion of the curriculum, students must pass the USMLE Step 2 CK, prior to graduation.

Caribbean Medical University School of Medicine was chartered in and recognized by the government of the Netherlands Antilles on November 9, 2007.

CMU is currently accredited by Accreditation of Educational Programs and Organizations (AAEPO), a World Federation for Medical Education (WFME) Accredited Agency through 2031.

== Curriculum ==
The MD program at CMU is a 11 semester course of study that consists of three semesters per calendar year. Semesters 1-4 are basic sciences semesters that are completed at the university's Curaçao campus. One Semester is a USMLE review course. Semesters 6-11 consist of 72 weeks of clinical clerkships that are completed at hospitals in the United States.

CMU also offers a 3 semester pre-medical program for high school graduates who have not completed the necessary prerequisites for the MD program. Pre-Med courses can be done at CMU's Curaçao campus.

CMU is on the Canadian Government's List of Designated Educational Institutions

== See also ==
- International medical graduate
- List of medical schools in the Caribbean
