= Stoas University of Applied Sciences =

Applied sciences college in Ede, Netherlands

Stoas University of Applied Sciences (Dutch: Stoas Hogeschool) is a Dutch vocational college with the head office in Ede.

Stoas University of Applied Sciences is training new teachers, trainers and consultants for agricultural and horticultural education in the Netherlands. This can be for the level Middelbaar Beroepsonderwijs (vocational education) or for college (secondary education) and adult education (Beroeps- en Volwasseneneducatie in Dutch). Since 2003 there is also an International course with a one-year curriculum.
