= Saba University School of Medicine =

Private medical school on the island of Saba

Coordinates: 17.625791°N 63.2467°W

- Motto: Empowering the Next Generation of Doctors
- Type: Medical School
- Established: 1992
- President: Cyndi McLeod, MBA
- Dean: Rachel Robson, Ph.D.
- Location: Saba
- Website: www.saba.edu

Saba University School of Medicine (SUSOM) is a private medical school located on the island of Saba, a special municipality of the Netherlands in the Caribbean. SUSOM offers an accredited 4-year Doctor of Medicine (MD) program. It is owned by Global University Systems, which also owns Medical University of the Americas and St. Matthew's University. Saba and MUA are sister schools because they share the same curriculum.

== History ==
Saba University School of Medicine was founded in 1992 as an international alternative to U.S. and Canadian medical schools. Since its founding, 3,500+ students have earned their medical degree at SUSOM.

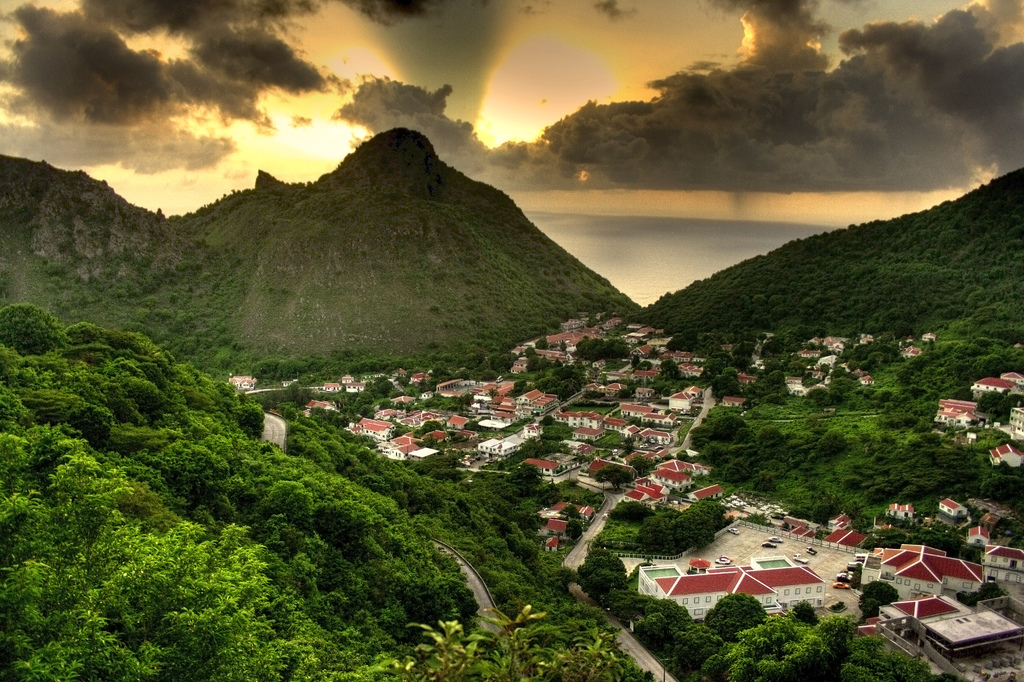
Bird's eye view of Saba School of Medicine

In 2006, the people of Saba, Sint Eustatius and Bonaire agreed to dissolve the Netherlands Antilles. Upon the imminent dissolution of the country, the ministers of health of the Netherlands and the Netherlands Antilles requested the Accreditation Organisation of the Netherlands and Flanders (NVAO) to assess the quality of all medical schools in the Netherlands Antilles. SUSOM was the only medical school in the Netherlands Antilles that earned accreditation, and thus was the only medical school to be allowed to stay in those islands.

== Curriculum ==
=== Basic Science Curriculum ===
The first five semesters of SUSOM's MD program, called Basic Science, follow an outline comparable to those of U.S. medical schools. These semesters consist of lab work and course material, following a progression beginning with foundational concepts in biomedical sciences and leading to organ-systems focused courses that relate each foundational discipline to human function and disease. Applications of basic science to clinical medicine are highlighted throughout the five semesters. Basic Sciences students learn with real human cadavers. All classes are taught in English.

=== "Research: Literature Review and Analysis" Module ===
In the sixth semester of the SUSOM MD program, students complete a "Research: Literature Review and Analysis" module, designed to further develop the ability of student to evaluate and assimilate scientific evidence and reinforce the skills for critically appraising and communicating medical knowledge.

Students analyze a current and complex medical care question, develop a hypothesis, analyze the literature, and write a paper that is evaluated by a faculty committee. According to the school's website, students have had their papers published in medical journals and have also reported that their research played a role in obtaining a residency appointment.

=== Clinical Medicine Curriculum ===
The Clinical Medicine component of the SUSOM MD program occurs during semesters 6-10. It consists of required and elective rotations at affiliated teaching hospitals, clinics and medical centers in the U.S., and select elective rotation sites in Canada. Students who successfully complete the Clinical Medicine program are awarded their medical degree and are ready for residency. The SUSOM Clinical Medicine curriculum consists of:

- 42 weeks of required core rotations in Surgery (12 weeks), Internal Medicine (12 weeks), Pediatrics (6 weeks), Psychiatry (6 weeks), and Obstetrics and Gynecology (6 weeks).
- 30 weeks of elective clinical rotations that students select based on their desired medical specialty.

During rotations, MD program students work in concert with licensed medical doctors and hospital staff, conducting hands-on examinations, treatments and general care. This on-site experience is supplemented by additional case studies and associated assignments.

=== Academic Outcomes ===
According to the U.S. Department of Education, 75% of U.S. medical students completed the MD program on time in 2019. This figure dropped down to 30.43% (14 of 46) in 2023.

Pass rates of its students and graduates on the United States Medical Licensing Examinations (USMLE) in calendar year 2023 were as follows:
Step 1 – Basic Science: 96.88%
Step 2 – Clinical Knowledge (CK): 97.53%

== Accreditation and approvals ==
Saba University School of Medicine is accredited by the Accreditation Organization of the Netherlands and Flanders (NVAO), which is recognized by the World Federation of Medical Education (WFME). SUSOM is the only medical school in the Caribbean to meet the rigorous standards of European accreditation. MD program graduates go on to practice in the United States, Canada and internationally.

SUSOM has been approved by the following U.S. states, which have separate review processes for the purposes of licensure, rotations and residency:

- Approved by the New York State Education Department
- Recognized by the Medical Board of California
- Licensed by the Commission for Independent Education, Florida Department of Education
- Approved by the Kansas State Board of Healing Arts

SUSOM is approved to participate in U.S. Title IV Federal Student Aid programs offered through the U.S. Department of Education. Canadian students in the MD program are eligible for government financial aid in their province or territory of residence.

== Student Life ==
The SUSOM MD program features 20 months of classroom and lab-based learning (Basic Science) on the island of Saba, and students are required to attend in-person. First-semester MD program students are encouraged to live on campus, in the Hillside Dorms.

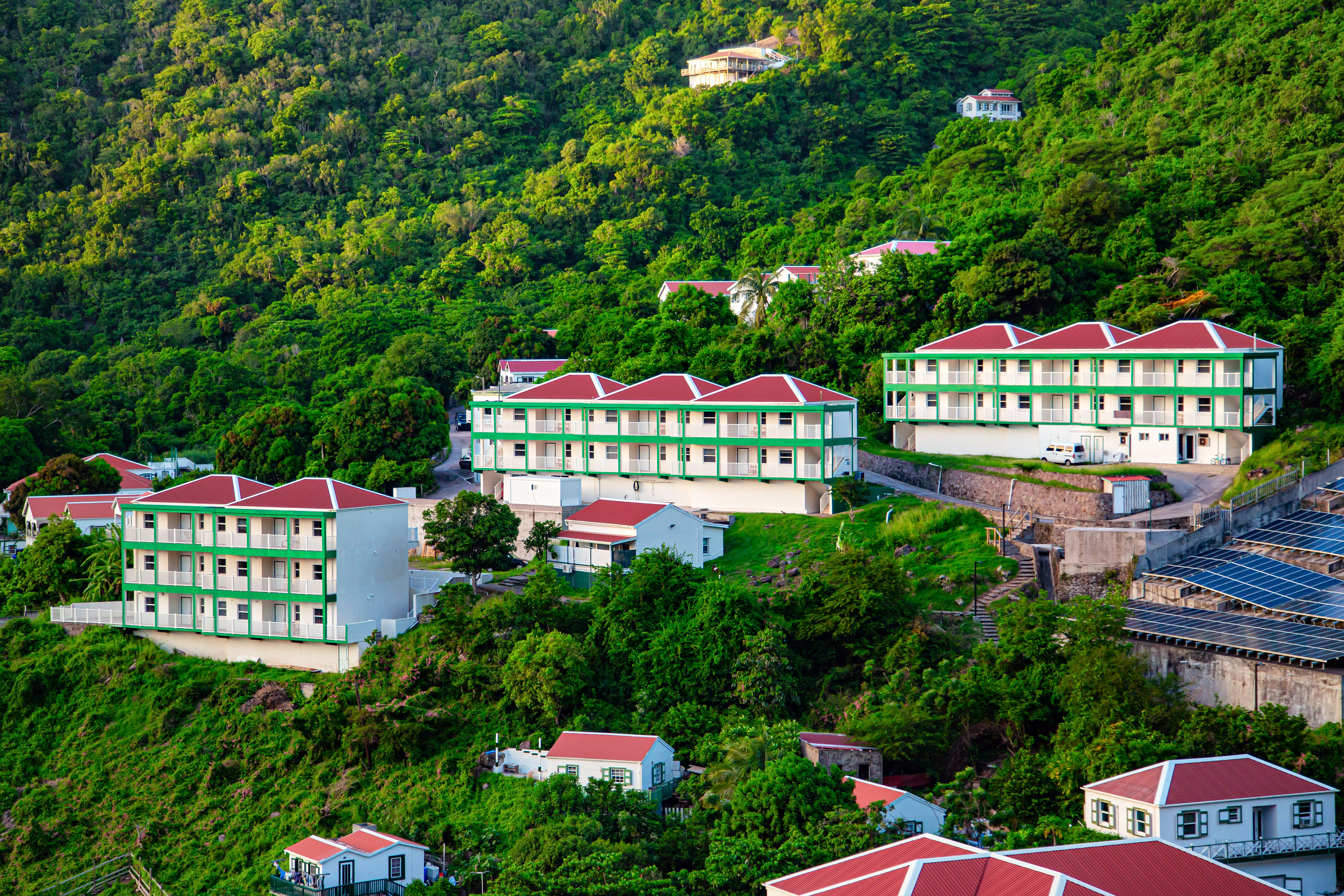
Hillside Dorms for Saba University School of Medicine MD program students

SUSOM students have access to different academic and personal support services, including:

- Academic coaching
- Career advising
- Faculty advisors
- Specialty Spotlight Series
- Student counseling
- The Road to Residency Program
- The Learning Center
- Wellness programming

Student clubs and organizations also exist, including:

- Christian Students Organization
- Muslim Students Association
- South Asian Student Society
- Student Government Association
- Women's Medical Student Association
