= Aureus University School of Medicine =

Medical school in Aruba

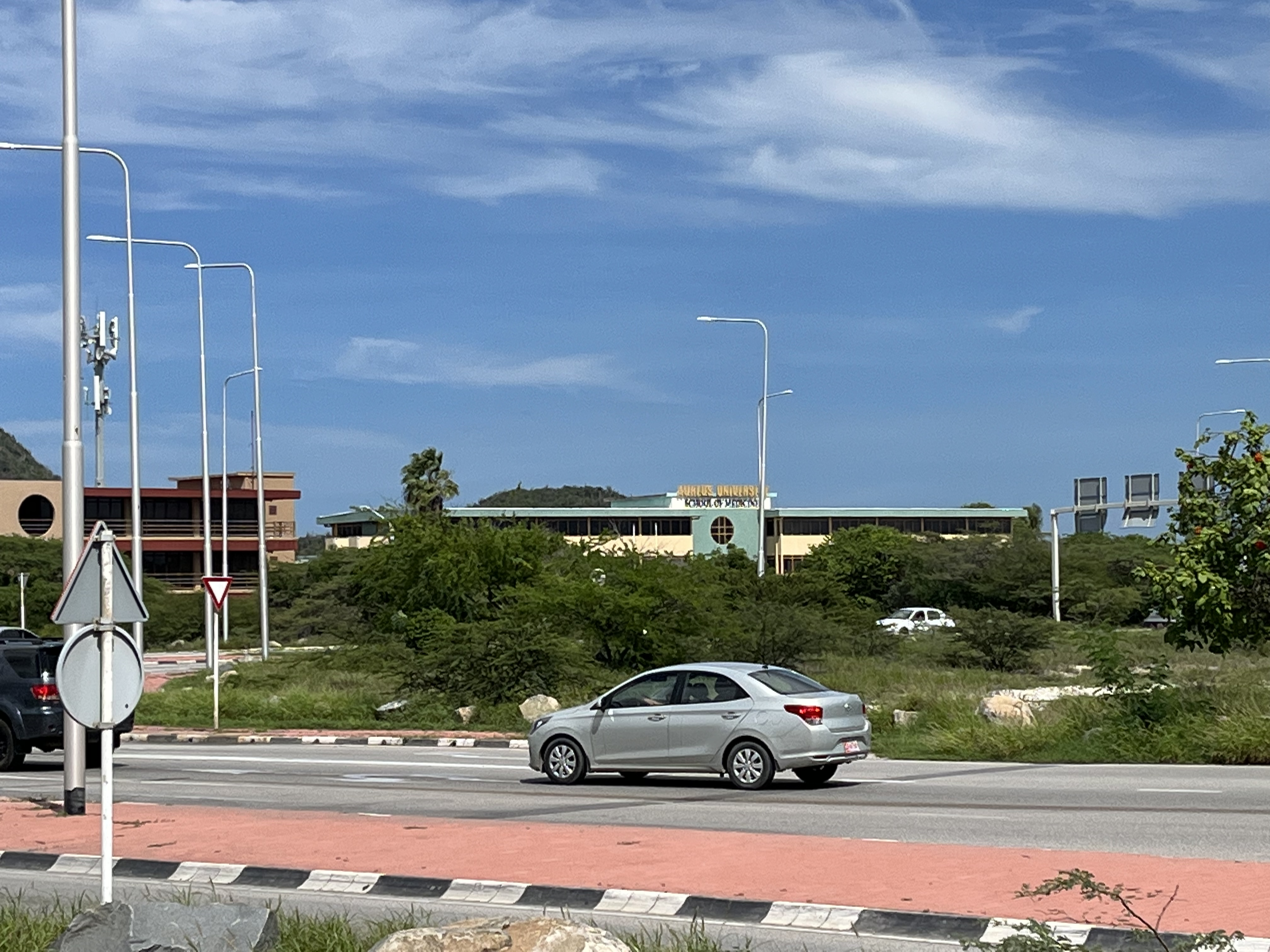
- Former name: All Saints University of Medicine (2004-2011)
- Type: Private
- Established: 2004
- Accreditation: ACCM Voluntarily withdrawn
- President: Ajit Rampure
- Location: Oranjestad, Aruba; 12°30′24.28″N 70°0′23.78″W
- Campus: Medical School Campus
- Colors: Red, blue, and gold
- Website: aureusuniversity.com

Aureus University School of Medicine (previously named as All Saints University of Medicine) is a private university located in Oranjestad, Aruba. Aureus confers upon its graduates the Doctor of Medicine (MD) degree.

== History ==
Aureus University School of Medicine was founded in 2004 in Aruba. On January 4, 2011, the school announced it was changing its name from All Saints University of Medicine to coincide with facility enhancements and to distinguish itself from universities with the same name. The current campus was completed in 2012 and contains 8 lecture halls. In 2024 Aureus University has been transferred to a New Canadian based management.

== Curriculum ==
Aureus offers a 4-year and 5 year MD degree program. The 4 year MD program is an 11 semester course of study that consists of three semesters per calendar year; the 5 year MD program includes an additional 3 semesters of pre-medical coursework.

Semesters 1-5 of the MD program are basic sciences (integrated) semesters that are completed at the university's Aruba campus. Laboratory experiences are an integral part of these first two years, along with small group discussions designed for systems-based learning and early integration of basic sciences into the clinical experience. The school offers the NBME CBSE exam and Kaplan Review course for the USMLE Step1 examination.

Semesters 6-11, clinical rotations, consist of 72–80 weeks of clinical study that include 48 weeks of core rotations and 24 weeks of elective rotations that are completed at affiliated hospitals in the United States and Canada.

== Tuition ==
MD 1-5 tuition is on average $10000 per semester for student attending the main campus in Aruba. Clinical tuition is on average $12,745 per semester.

== Accreditation ==
Aureus University School of Medicine is chartered in and recognized by the government of Aruba. Aureus is listed in ECFMG and FAIMER, the International Medical Education Directory (IMED), the Medical Council of India (MCI) and the Medical Council of Canada (MCC). Aureus students are eligible to take the USMLE Step examinations and are eligible to participate in the National Resident Match Program (NRMP).

== See also ==
- Medical School
- International medical graduate
- List of medical schools in the Caribbean
