= Texila American University Guyana =

Private university in Providence, Guyana

Coordinates: 6.7588°N 58.1738°W

Texila American University
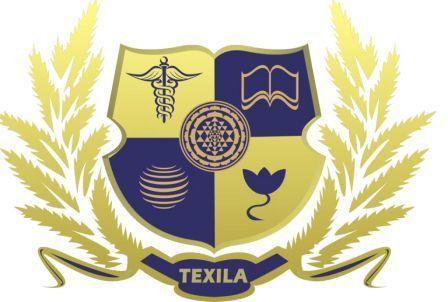
- Texila American University Guyana
- Other name: TAU Guyana
- Motto: Bringing Education to Life
- Type: Private
- Established: September 2010; 16 years ago
- Accreditation: NACG, CAAM-HP, ACCM, BAC
- Affiliations: Texila American University Consortium
- President: S. P. Saju Bhaskar
- Dean: Dheeraj Bansal (Medicine)
- Head of Institution: Syamkumar Gopinathan
- Location: Georgetown, Guyana
- Language: English
- Website: Official Website

Texila American University (TAU) is a private higher education institution established in 2010 in Guyana. Its main campus is located in Providence, East Bank Demerara. The university offers programmes in medicine, health sciences, public health, nursing, business, and management. It is part of the Texila American University Consortium.

== History ==
Texila American University was established in Guyana in September 2010. In its early years, the university operated from the Critchlow Labour College compound in Georgetown and offered programmes in medicine and dentistry. By 2012, the university reported an expanding international student body and announced plans to introduce a nursing programme.

In 2017, the university moved to a purpose-built campus at Providence, East Bank Demerara. The campus, constructed on approximately five acres, included lecture rooms, laboratories, a library, computer facilities and clinical skills training spaces. At the time, the university reported more than 600 students representing over 40 nationalities in Guyana.

In 2023, the university announced that its medical programme had obtained accreditation from both the Caribbean Accreditation Authority for Education in Medicine and Other Health Professions (CAAM-HP), with accreditation with conditions for the period 2023–2026. and the Accreditation Commission on Colleges of Medicine (ACCM) for the period 2023–2029.

The university expanded its educational support facilities in October 2024 with the opening of a study centre at Suddie on the Essequibo Coast. The centre was established to provide study space and support for students, including participants in the Guyana Online Academy of Learning (GOAL) programme.

Texila American University has also participated as a partner institution in Guyana's GOAL programme. In January 2026, the Department of Public Information reported that the first group of GOAL scholars completing doctoral programmes through the university had graduated, including candidates in management and public health.

== Accreditation and recognition ==
Texila American University in Guyana is registered with the National Accreditation Council of Guyana (NACG).

The university's Doctor of Medicine programme is listed in the World Directory of Medical Schools.

Its Doctor of Medicine programme is accredited by the Accreditation Commission on Colleges of Medicine (ACCM) for the period 2023–2029.

Texila American University is also accredited by the Caribbean Accreditation Authority for Education in Medicine and Other Health Professions (CAAM-HP), with accreditation with conditions for the period 2023–2026.

Texila American University also holds institutional accreditation from the British Accreditation Council (BAC) for the period 2024–2028.

Texila American University is listed in the World Higher Education Database (WHED), maintained by the International Association of Universities.

=== International recognition and eligibility ===
Texila American University College of Medicine is listed in the World Directory of Medical Schools. The directory states that students and graduates of the medical school are eligible to apply for ECFMG Certification, provided that their graduation year and other applicable ECFMG requirements are met. The World Directory lists eligible graduation years from 2011 to the present.

The World Directory also states that, unless otherwise indicated, medical degrees obtained from Texila American University College of Medicine are acceptable to provincial and territorial medical regulatory authorities in Canada. Graduates seeking postgraduate training or medical registration in Canada remain subject to the requirements of the Medical Council of Canada, provincial or territorial regulators, and other applicable bodies.

Indian citizens and Overseas Citizens of India who obtain their primary medical qualification outside India and subsequently seek medical registration in India are subject to the National Medical Commission's Foreign Medical Graduate Licentiate Regulations and other applicable requirements.

== Academic structure ==
The university offers undergraduate and postgraduate programmes approved by the National Accreditation Council of Guyana (NACG). Approved programmes listed by the NACG include:

- Doctor of Medicine
- Doctor of Business Administration
- Doctor of Public Health Administration
- Doctor of Philosophy in Nursing
- Master of Business Administration
- Master of Public Health
- Bachelor of Public Health

The Doctor of Medicine programme is listed in the World Directory of Medical Schools. The directory records English as the language of instruction and states that foreign students are admitted.

=== Curriculum ===
According to information published by the university, the Doctor of Medicine programme is organised into pre-clinical and clinical phases. The university states that the programme includes simulation-based learning, digital learning resources, and community-based clinical exposure.

==== Clinical training ====
Texila American University provides clinical training opportunities for medical students in Guyana and the United States. Its published clinical training locations include Georgetown Public Hospital Corporation (GPHC) in Georgetown, Guyana, and Marana Medical Center in Arizona, United States.

Clinical placements are subject to programme requirements, student eligibility, site availability and applicable institutional policies.

== Campus ==
The university's main campus is located in Providence, East Bank Demerara, Guyana. The institution moved to its Providence campus in 2017.

== Admissions ==
The university admits international students, with English as the language of instruction. Texila American University and its College of Medicine are designated institutions under the Government of Canada's Canadian Student Loans Program, making Canadian citizens and permanent residents eligible to apply for federal student loan assistance.

== Leadership and governance ==
According to British Accreditation Council (BAC) institutional records:

- S. P. Saju Bhaskar – President and Founder
- Syamkumar Gopinathan – Head of Institution
- Dr. Dheeraj Bansal – Dean of the College of Medicine, Texila American University

== Research and publications ==
TAU publishes the Texila International Journal of Public Health, which is indexed in Scopus with a Q4 ranking.

== See also ==
- Medical School
- List of medical schools in the Caribbean
