= Avalon University School of Medicine =

Medical school in Willemstad, Curacao

- Other name: AUSOM
- Former name: Xavier University School of Medicine (2003-2010)
- Type: Private medical school
- Established: 2003
- Chancellor: Shokat Fatteh
- President: Samir Fatteh
- Dean: Sateesh B. Arja
- Location: Willemstad, Curaçao; 12.1070°N 68.9272°W
- Website: avalonu.org

Avalon University School of Medicine (AUSOM) (previously Xavier University School of Medicine in Bonaire) is a private medical school located in Willemstad, Curaçao, in the Caribbean. AUSOM confers upon its graduates the Doctor of Medicine (MD) degree. Administrative offices for the university are located in Youngstown, Ohio.

== History ==
AUSOM was founded in 2003 in Bonaire in the Netherlands Antilles (now known as the Caribbean Netherlands) as the Xavier University School of Medicine. In 2010, the university relocated to Curaçao and changed its name to Avalon University School of Medicine to differentiate itself from another university with the same name.

== Programs ==
=== Bachelors of Science in Health Science ===
Avalon offers a bachelors program in combination with their MD program (BS/MD). The eligibility requirement to enter the bachelors of science (BS) program is being a high school graduate. This program is also for students who have not attained the undergraduate prerequisite requirements for entrance into the medical program. The BS program is an accelerated two-year program, with the first-year completed online and the second-year completed at the Avalon campus in Curacao. Upon successful completion students will earn a BS degree and gain automatic admission into the MD program.

=== School of Medicine ===
Avalon has a 4-year curriculum leading to the Doctor of Medicine degree. The first two years consist of five semesters of the basic sciences taught by experienced and qualified M.D. and PhD faculty members. The final semester of the basic sciences is the "board preparatory" semester to prepare for the United States Medical Licensing Exam (USMLE) Step 1. Avalon requires students to pass the USMLE Step 1 prior to starting clinical rotations. The final two years is the clinical science program in which students will complete 72 weeks of clinical rotations at their affiliated hospitals in the United States. The first 48 weeks are considered the Core rotations (Internal Medicine, Surgery, Pediatrics, Family Medicine, Obstetrics and Gynecology, and Psychiatry). The final 24 weeks are the elective rotations, and students may choose elective rotations so that they can explore different fields of medicine that interest them. Passing the USMLE Step 2 is required for graduation.

== Accreditation, recognitions and listings ==
- Avalon University School of Medicine (AUSOM) is chartered by the Government of Curaçao to offer an MD degree. AUSOM is listed in the World Directory of Medical Schools. AUSOM students are eligible to take the United States Medical Licensing Exams (USMLE), as well as the Medical Council of Canada Qualifying Exams (MCCQE).
- AUSOM received its six-year accreditation from the Accreditation Commission on Colleges of Medicine (ACCM) in May 2022.
- AUSOM received its four-year accreditation from the Caribbean Accreditation Authority for Education in Medicine and other Medicine and other Health Professions (CAAM-HP) in August 2023.

Both ACCM and CAAM-HP are internationally recognized accrediting bodies listed by the National Committee on Foreign Medical Education and Accreditation (NCFMEA), part of the US Department of Education, as "found to use standards to accredit their medical schools that are comparable to the standards used to accredit medical schools in the United States.

- With ACCM and CAAM-HP accreditation, AUSOM graduates are eligible to apply for residency and medical practice in the state of California. As the Medical Board of California states, "A foreign medical school which has been evaluated by the Educational Commission for Foreign Medical Graduates (ECFMG) or one of the ECFMG authorized foreign medical school accreditation agencies and deemed to meet the minimum requirements substantially equivalent to the requirements of medical schools accredited by the Liaison Committee on Medical Education, the Committee on Accreditation of Canadian Medical Schools, or the Commission on Osteopathic College Accreditation."

== Alumni ==
Some notable alumni include:

- Rajiv Mallipudi — COVID-19 unit medical director, hospital medicine, Yale University School of Medicine

== See also ==
- International medical graduate
- List of medical schools in the Caribbean
