= American University of the Caribbean =

International medical school

Coordinates: 18°3′1″N 63°7′37″W

American University of the Caribbean School of Medicine
- Type: Private, Medical School
- Established: 1978
- Dean: Mark Rosenberg, M.D.
- Faculty: 75 (on main campus)
- Students: ≈650 on main campus
- Location: Sint Maarten, Kingdom of the Netherlands
- Website: aucmed.edu

The American University of the Caribbean School of Medicine (AUC) is a private for-profit medical school. Its main campus is located in Sint Maarten, and a second campus for non-US students is located in Preston, UK. AUC is owned by Covista.

== History ==
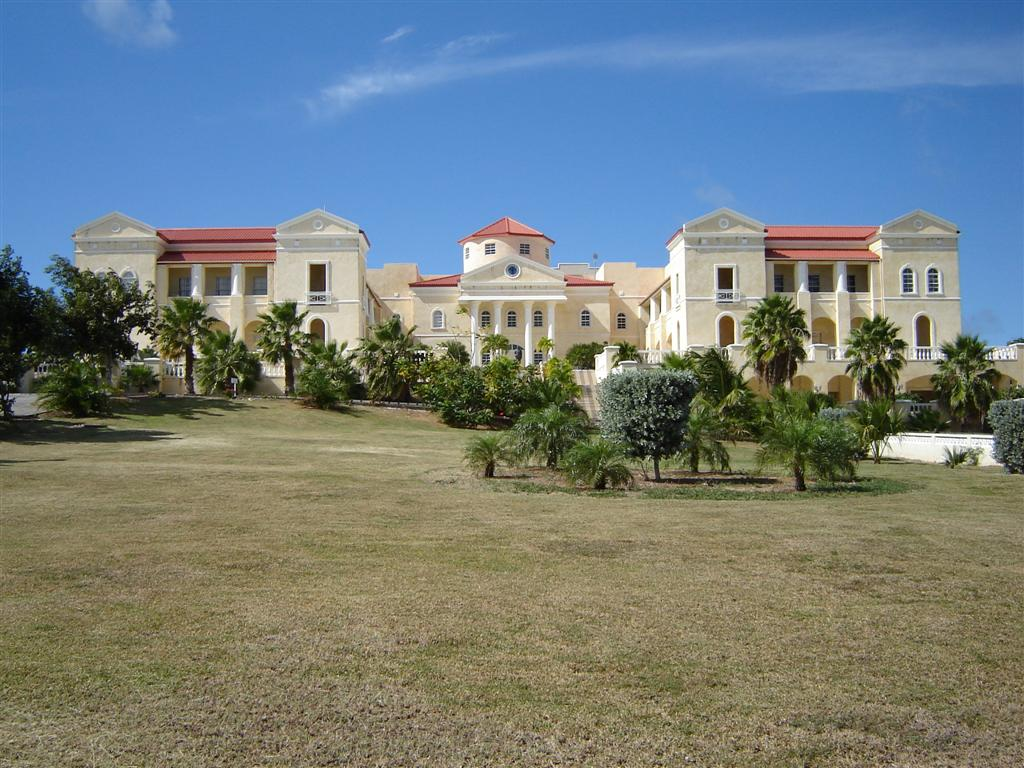
American University of the Caribbean main campus in Sint Maarten

=== Montserrat ===
AUC was founded by American educator Dr. Paul Tien in 1978. The main campus of the American University of the Caribbean was originally located on the island of Montserrat. However, the university had to be evacuated in 1995 due to volcanic activity in the Soufrière Hills. The campus remained closed for two years, until it was finally destroyed by pyroclastic flow from the volcano in 1997.

=== St. Maarten ===
AUC purchased a parcel of land in the village of Cupecoy on the Dutch side of St. Martin and construction of a permanent campus began in July 1996. The new campus opened on 1 May 1998. AUC's new campus consists of teaching and learning facilities featuring classrooms and laboratories, an imaging anatomy lab, a microbiology lab, and a medical library. The school was purchased by Adtalem Global Education in 2011 for $235 million. The current dean of AUC is Mark Rosenberg.

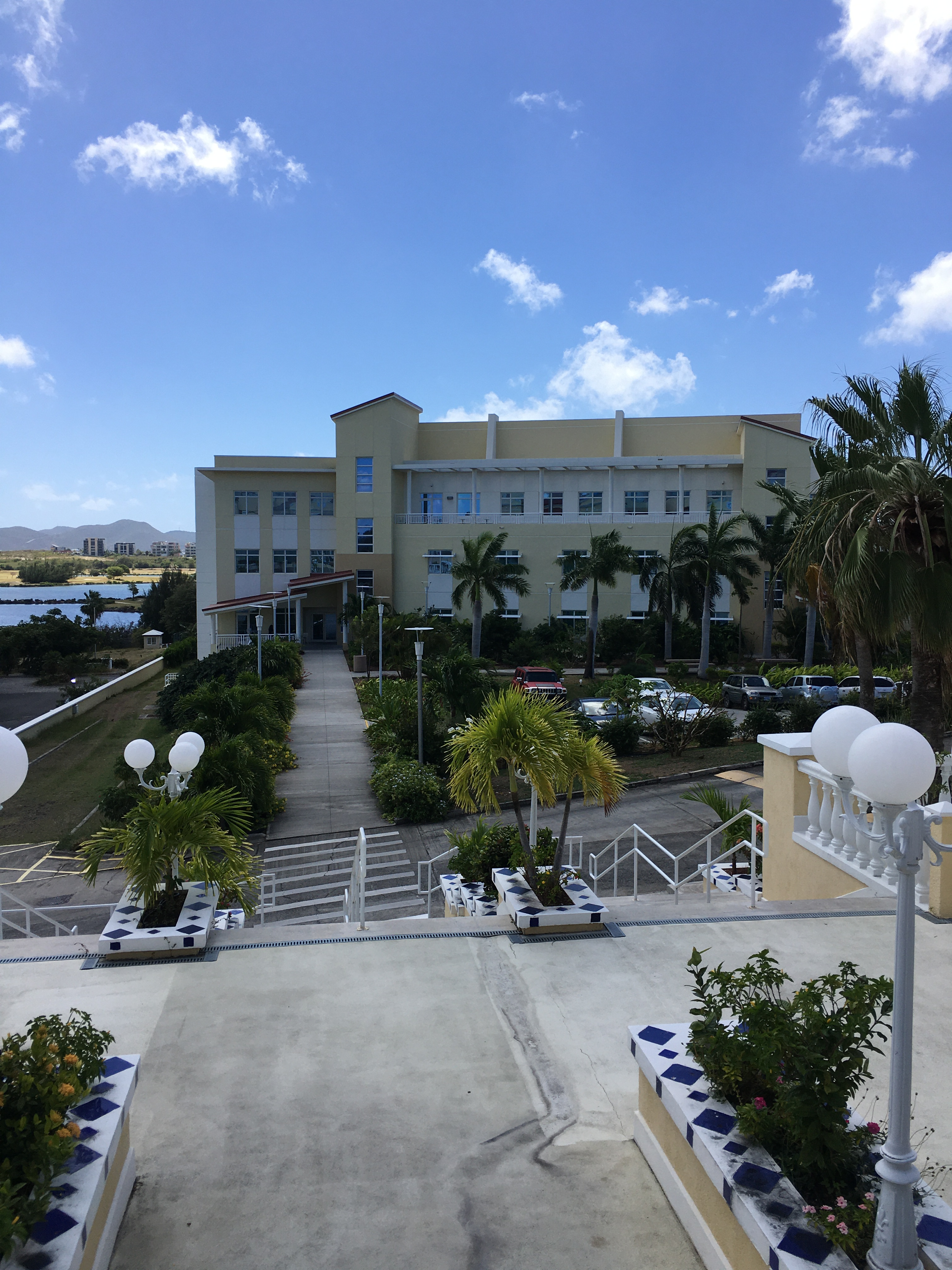
Building 2

=== Hurricane Irma ===
Hurricane Irma struck Sint Maarten on September 5 and 6 2017 and the AUC campus, including the dormitories, suffered minor damage. Classes had to be canceled and all students were evacuated off the island of Sint Maarten, as the island attempted to restore basic services. According to the AUC's official hurricane update page, students were sheltered in a building that was engineered and designed to withstand a category 5 hurricane (Building 2). Supplies were distributed to sheltered students, colleagues, and loved ones in the storm's aftermath. Several residences, where students were staying, were "completely destroyed--and food and water is scarce", according to the CBC. The school arranged for students to start the next semester on September 29, 2017, having made an arrangements with a North West England university (University of Central Lancashire) to share their facilities until students were able to return to the Sint Maarten campus.

== Curriculum ==
After completing the initial 5 semesters (20 months) of study in the Medical Sciences portion on AUC's St. Maarten campus, students then conduct 4.5 semesters (18 months) of training in the Clinical Sciences portion (also known as the Clinical Years) at AUC's affiliated community hospitals, whereby the students may choose between community hospitals in the United States or The United Kingdom. Both the required core rotations (Internal Medicine, Surgery, Pediatrics, OB/GYN, and Psychiatry) and elective rotations in any specialty may be taken at one or several different clinical sites. BronxCare Hospital System is the largest clinical site that AUC has a contract with.

== Accreditation, recognition and licensure ==
Since 1995, AUC has been accredited by Accreditation Commission of Colleges of Medicine. ACCM is an independent accrediting body based in Ireland that accredits medical schools on behalf of several governments.

AUC is included in the list of approved schools recognized by the Medical Board of California. AUC is listed with the World Directory of Medical Schools' directory which indicates that students and graduates of this medical school are eligible to apply to ECFMG for Certification.

Some US states in the have their own approval processes for medical schools. AUC is approved by the New York State Education Department (NYSED) to allow students to complete more than 12 weeks of clinical clerkships in New York State. AUC is one of eight Caribbean medical schools so approved by NYSED. Additionally, Florida has approved AUC to allow medical students to do clinical rotations in that state. AUC graduates (post September 2019) are eligible for registration with the General Medical Council in the United Kingdom, which as a result means that graduates can complete postgraduate (residency) training or work at any stage of their careers as practicing clinicians in the UK.

== Student loan debt ==
The US Department of Education reported that the median total student loan debt for Americans who completed the AUC medical program was $331,634 (as of 2019). The default rate as of 2016 was 0.7%. The US DOE also reported 63.49% on time completion for those completing the program.

== See also ==
- International medical graduate
- List of medical schools in the Caribbean
