= Medical Board of California =

Government agency in the United States

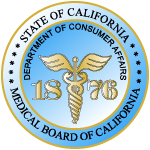

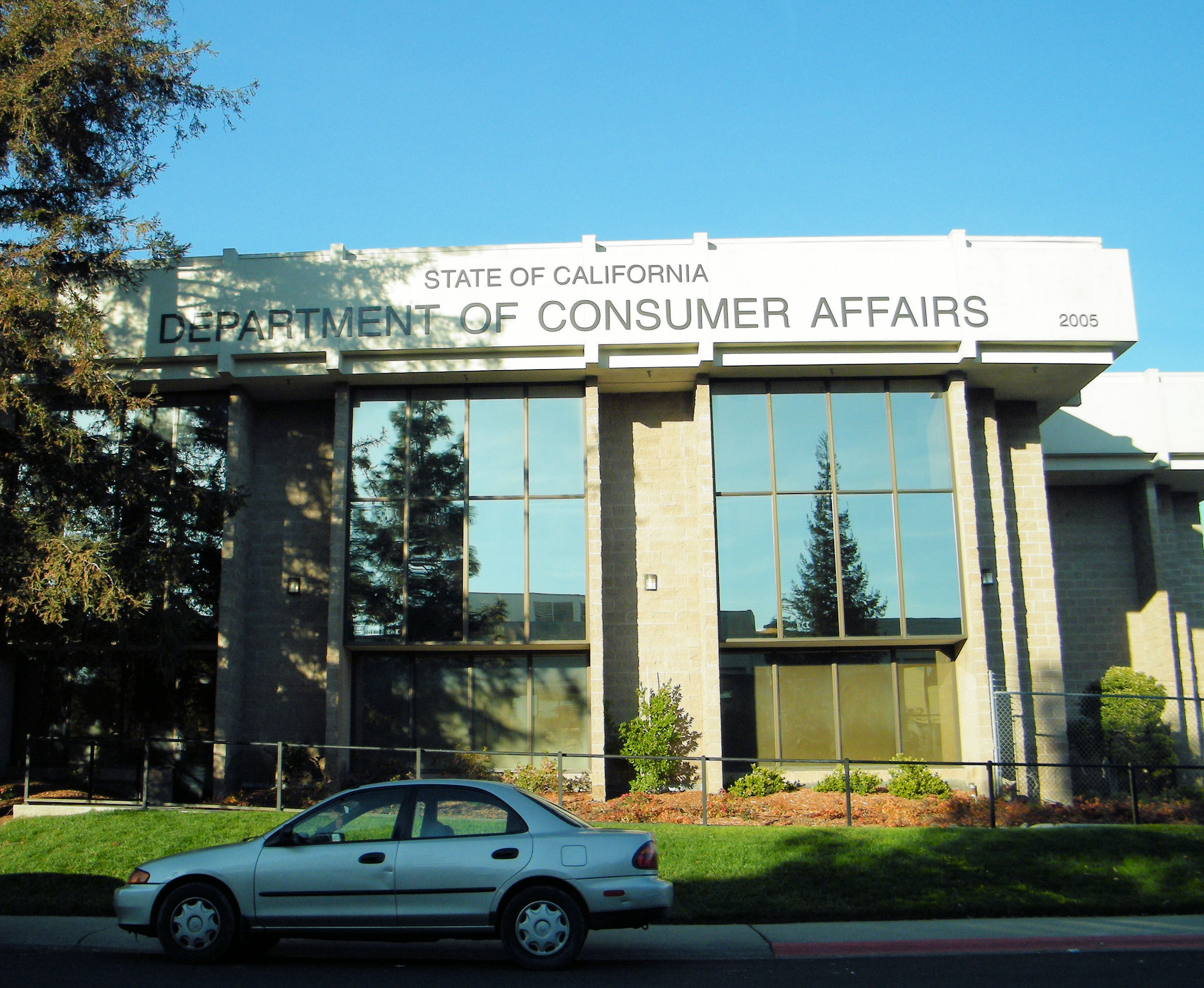
- Headquarters in Sacramento

Board overview
- Jurisdiction: California
- Headquarters: Sacramento, California
- Board executives: Randy W. Hawkins, M.D., President; Laurie Rose Lubiano, J.D., Vice President; James M. Healzer, M.D., Secretary; Reji Varghese, Executive Director
- Parent department: California Department of Consumer Affairs
- Website: www.mbc.ca.gov

The Medical Board of California (MBC) is a state government agency which licenses and disciplines physicians, surgeons and certain allied healthcare professionals in California. The Board provides two principal types of services to consumers: (1) public-record information about California-licensed physicians, and (2) investigation of complaints against physicians.

The Board is part of the California Department of Consumer Affairs and has headquarters in Sacramento. It has an annual budget of $65.277 million. The MBC is the oldest component of DCA, dating back to the 1878 revision of the Medical Practice Act of 1876. MBC is a member of the Federation of State Medical Boards.

The members of the Board are eight physicians and five public members appointed by the Governor, one public member appointed by the Speaker of the Assembly, and one public member appointed by the Senate Rules Committee.

In fiscal year 2016-2017, the Board had 137,967 physician licenses in effect, and issued 6,802 new physician licenses.

In FY 2016-17, the Board received 9,619 complaints and opened 1,465 investigations. The outcome in FY 2016-17 was 42 license revocations, 101 license surrenders, six probations with suspension, 171 probations, 86 public reprimands, and 43 criminal referrals.

In fiscal year 2017-2018, the Board had 140,748 physician licenses in effect, and issued 6,694 new physician licenses.

In FY 2017-18, the Board received 10,888 complaints and opened 1,627 cases. The outcome in FY 2017-18 was 59 license revocations, 98 license surrenders, 5 probations with suspension, 139 probations, 133 public reprimands, and 14 convictions of crimes.

== Whistleblower lawsuit against the Medical Board of California, 2021 ==
TJ Watkins, a public board member of The Medical Board of California, filed a whistleblower lawsuit against the board with the state auditor's office urging the agency to investigate the inner workings of the board and its decisions, which are largely cloaked under the law. Watkins said the board is designed to silence aggrieved patients. "It's one thing to not feel heard; it's another to be dismissed and ignored," said Watkins. "The main thing that people who write to me want is for this not to happen again. They have made peace that nothing will happen with their particular case, but they fight because they don't want this to happen to anyone else. I feel that."
