= Xavier University School of Medicine =

Private medical school in Oranjestad, Aruba

- Type: Private not for-profit medical school
- Established: 2004
- President: Ravishankar Bhooplapur
- Location: Oranjestad, Aruba
- Website: www.xusom.com

Xavier University School of Medicine is a private offshore medical school located in Oranjestad, Aruba.

== About ==
Xavier University School of Medicine (XUSOM) was founded in 2004 and is chartered by the government of Aruba with authorization by the Ministry of Education of Aruba to confer the Doctor of Medicine (M.D.) degree and other health professional degrees. XUSOM was initially accredited by the Accreditation Commission of Colleges of Medicine in 2015. Its accreditation has been extended through 2028.

The old school building is located in Oranjestad, the capital and largest city in Aruba. The old campus houses classrooms with audiovisual aids, laboratories including an Anatomy dissection lab with plastinated cadavers and Anatomage table, skills and simulation labs, faculty offices, administrative and support staff, a library, and transportation facilities.

== Academics ==
The medical training at Xavier University School of Medicine at Aruba is a four-year program of basic and clinical sciences. The student-to-teacher ratio is approximately 6:1.

== Accreditation and recognition ==
- Xavier University School of Medicine is listed in the World Directory of Medical Schools (WDMS).
- Xavier University School of Medicine is recognized by the New York State Education Department (NYSED) to allow students to complete more than 12 weeks of clinical clerkships in New York State. XUSOM is one of eight medical schools in the Caribbean approved by NYSED.
- Xavier University School of Medicine is accredited by the Accreditation Commission on Colleges of Medicine (ACCM) of Ireland. ACCM is the official accreditation body for the medical schools in Aruba.
- In 2022, Xavier University announced it earned reaccreditation by the Accreditation Commission on Colleges of Medicine (ACCM) through December 31, 2028.
- Additionally, Xavier’s primary medical qualification appears on the UK General Medical Council’s list of overseas medical qualifications that may be accepted for GMC registration subject to assessment by the GMC.

== See also ==
- International medical graduate
- List of medical schools in the Caribbean
