= National Committee on Foreign Medical Education and Accreditation =

The National Committee on Foreign Medical Education and Accreditation is a committee within the US Department of Education. It is responsible for assessing the accreditation standards of non-US medical schools and determining if those standards are "comparable" with US standards. The Committee does not license or accredit foreign medical schools directly.
