= Outline of Anguilla =

Island and British Overseas Territory in the Caribbean

The Flag of Anguilla

The Coat of arms of Anguilla

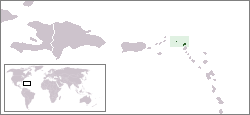
The location of Anguilla

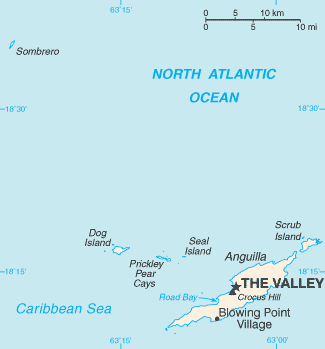
An enlargeable map of the British Overseas Territory of Anguilla

The following outline is provided as an overview of and topical guide to Anguilla:

Anguilla is one of the most northerly of the Leeward Islands in the Lesser Antilles, lying east of Puerto Rico and the Virgin Islands and directly north of Saint Martin. Anguilla has become a popular tax haven, having no capital gains, estate, profit or other forms of direct taxation on either individuals or corporations.

== General reference ==
- Pronunciation:
- Common English country name: Anguilla
- Official English country name: Anguilla
- Common endonym(s):
- Official endonym(s):
- Adjectival(s): Anguillan (disambiguation)
- Demonym(s):
- ISO country codes: AI, AIA, 660
- ISO region codes: See ISO 3166-2:AI
- Internet country code top-level domain: .ai

== Geography of Anguilla ==
Geography of Anguilla

- Anguilla is: an island and British overseas territory consisting of it and a number of smaller islands and cays.
- Location:
  - Northern Hemisphere and Western Hemisphere
    - North America (off the East Coast of the United States, southeast of Puerto Rico)
  - Atlantic Ocean
    - Caribbean
      - Antilles
        - Lesser Antilles (island chain)
          - Leeward Islands
  - Time zone: Eastern Caribbean Time (UTC-04)
  - Extreme points of Anguilla
    - High: Crocus Hill 65 m (213 ft)
    - Low: Caribbean Sea 0 m
  - Land boundaries: none
  - Coastline: 61 km
- Population of Anguilla: 13,477 (2006) - 212th most populous country
- Area of Anguilla: 102 square kilometres (39 sq mi) - 220th largest country
- Atlas of Anguilla

=== Environment of Anguilla ===
- Climate of Anguilla
- Renewable energy in Anguilla
- Geology of Anguilla
- Protected areas of Anguilla
  - Biosphere reserves in Anguilla
  - National parks of Anguilla
- Wildlife of Anguilla
  - Fauna of Anguilla
    - Birds of Anguilla
    - Mammals of Anguilla

==== Natural geographic features of Anguilla ====
- Fjords of Anguilla
- Glaciers of Anguilla
- Islands of Anguilla
- Lakes of Anguilla
- Mountains of Anguilla
  - Volcanoes in Anguilla
- Rivers of Anguilla
  - Waterfalls of Anguilla
- Valleys of Anguilla
- World Heritage Sites in Anguilla: None

=== Regions of Anguilla ===
Regions of Anguilla

==== Ecoregions of Anguilla ====
List of ecoregions in Anguilla

==== Administrative divisions of Anguilla ====
Administrative divisions of Anguilla

- Municipalities of Anguilla

===== Municipalities of Anguilla =====
Municipalities of Anguilla

- Capital of Anguilla: The Valley
- Villages of Anguilla

=== Demography of Anguilla ===
Demographics of Anguilla

== Government and politics of Anguilla ==
Politics of Anguilla

- Form of government: parliamentary representative democratic dependency
- Capital of Anguilla: The Valley
- Elections in Anguilla
- Political parties in Anguilla

=== Branches of government ===
Government of Anguilla

==== Executive branch of the government of Anguilla ====
- Head of state: Monarch of the United Kingdom, King Charles III
  - Monarch's representative: Governor of Anguilla
- Head of government: Chief Minister of Anguilla
- Cabinet of Anguilla

==== Legislative branch of the government of Anguilla ====
- Anguilla House of Assembly

==== Judicial branch of the government of Anguilla ====
Court system of Anguilla

- Supreme Court of Anguilla

=== Foreign relations of Anguilla ===
Foreign relations of Anguilla

- Diplomatic missions in Anguilla
- Diplomatic missions of Anguilla

==== International organization membership ====
Anguilla is a member of:

- Caribbean Community and Common Market (Caricom) (associate)
- Caribbean Development Bank (CDB)
- International Criminal Police Organization (Interpol) (subbureau)
- Organisation of Eastern Caribbean States (OECS)
- Universal Postal Union (UPU)
- World Federation of Trade Unions (WFTU)

=== Law and order in Anguilla ===
Law of Anguilla

Law Enforcement in Anguilla

=== Military of Anguilla ===
Military of Anguilla

- Anguilla has no military of its own: Anguilla is a protectorate of the United Kingdom (UK), and the UK is responsible for its military defence.
- Command
  - Commander-in-chief
    - Ministry of Defence of Anguilla
- Forces
  - Army of Anguilla: none
  - Navy of Anguilla: none
  - Air Force of Anguilla: none
  - Special forces of Anguilla: none
- Military history of Anguilla
- Military ranks of Anguilla

=== Local government in Anguilla ===
Local government in Anguilla

== History of Anguilla ==
History of Anguilla

- Timeline of the history of Anguilla
- Current events of Anguilla
- Military history of Anguilla

== Culture of Anguilla ==
Culture of Anguilla

- Architecture of Anguilla
- Cuisine of Anguilla
- Festivals in Anguilla
- Languages of Anguilla
- Media in Anguilla
- National symbols of Anguilla
  - Coat of arms of Anguilla
  - Flag of Anguilla
  - National anthem of Anguilla
- People of Anguilla
- Public holidays in Anguilla
- Records of Anguilla
- Religion in Anguilla
  - Christianity in Anguilla
  - Hinduism in Anguilla
  - Islam in Anguilla
  - Judaism in Anguilla
  - Sikhism in Anguilla
- World Heritage Sites in Anguilla: None

=== Art in Anguilla ===
- Art in Anguilla
- Cinema of Anguilla
- Literature of Anguilla
- Music of Anguilla
- Television in Anguilla
- Theatre in Anguilla

=== Sports in Anguilla ===
Sports in Anguilla

- Football in Anguilla
- Anguilla at the Olympics

== Economy and infrastructure of Anguilla ==
Economy of Anguilla

- Economic rank, by nominal GDP (2007): 188th (one hundred and eighty eighth)
- Companies of Anguilla
- Currency of Anguilla: Dollar
  - ISO 4217: XCD
- Anguilla Stock Exchange
- Transport in Anguilla
  - Airports in Anguilla

== Education in Anguilla ==
Education in Anguilla

- List of schools in Anguilla
- Saint James School of Medicine

== See also ==
Anguilla

- Index of Anguilla-related articles
- List of Anguilla-related topics
- List of international rankings
- Outline of geography
- Outline of North America
- Outline of the Caribbean
- Outline of the United Kingdom
