= Index of Anguilla-related articles =

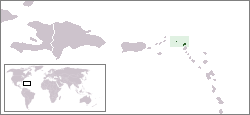
The location of the British Overseas Territory of Anguilla

The following is an alphabetical list of topics related to the British Overseas Territory of Anguilla.

== 0–9 ==
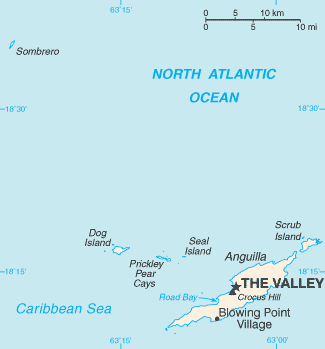
A map of Anguilla

- .ai – Internet country code top-level domain for Anguilla

== A ==
- Airports in Anguilla
- Americas
  - North America
    - North Atlantic Ocean
      - West Indies
        - Caribbean Sea
          - Antilles
            - Lesser Antilles
              - Islands of Angilla
- Anglo-America
- Anguilla
- Anguillan, adjective and noun for Anguilla
- Antilles
- Atlas of Anguilla
- Anguilla Channel

== B ==
- Bibliography of Anguilla
- Birds of Anguilla
- British Overseas Territory of Anguilla

== C ==
- Capital of Anguilla: The Valley
- Caribbean
- Caribbean Community (CARICOM)
- Caribbean Sea
- Categories:
  - Category:Anguilla
    - Category:Anguillan culture
    - Category:Anguillan law
    - The Coat of arms of Anguilla
    - Category:Anguillan people
    - Category:Anguilla-related lists
    - Category:Buildings and structures in Anguilla
    - Category:Communications in Anguilla
    - Category:Economy of Anguilla
    - Category:Environment of Anguilla
    - Category:Geography of Anguilla
    - Category:History of Anguilla
    - Category:Politics of Anguilla
    - Category:Society of Anguilla
    - Category:Sport in Anguilla
    - Category:Transport in Anguilla
  - commons:Category:Anguilla
- Coat of arms of Anguilla
- Commonwealth of Nations
- Culture of Anguilla

== D ==
- Demographics of Anguilla

== E ==
- Economy of Anguilla
- Education in Anguilla
- Elections in Anguilla
- English colonization of the Americas
- English language

== F ==
The Flag of Anguilla

- Flag of Anguilla
- Football clubs in Anguilla

== G ==
- Geography of Anguilla
- "God Bless Anguilla"
- Government of Anguilla

== H ==
- Hinduism in Anguilla
- History of Anguilla

== I ==
- International Organization for Standardization (ISO)
  - ISO 3166-1 alpha-2 country code for Anguilla: AI
  - ISO 3166-1 alpha-3 country code for Anguilla: AIA
- Islands of Angilla:
  - Anguilla island
  - Anguillita
  - Blowing Rock, Anguilla
  - Cove Cay
  - Crocus Cay
  - Deadman's Cay
  - Dog Island, Anguilla
  - East Cay
  - Little Island, Anguilla
  - Little Scrub Island
  - Mid Cay
  - North Cay
  - Prickley Pear Cays
  - Rabbit Island, Anguilla
  - Sand Island, Anguilla
  - Scilly Cay
  - Scrub Island
  - Seal Island, Anguilla
  - Sombrero, Anguilla
  - South Cay
  - South Wager Island
  - West Cay

== L ==
- Law of Anguilla
- Leeward Islands
- Lesser Antilles
- Lists related to Anguilla:
  - List of airports in Anguilla
  - List of Anguilla-related topics
  - List of birds of Anguilla
  - List of football clubs in Anguilla
  - List of islands of Angilla
  - List of mammals of Anguilla
  - List of political parties in Anguilla
  - List of schools in Anguilla
  - Topic outline of Anguilla

== M ==
- Mammals of Anguilla
- Military of Anguilla
- Music of Anguilla

== N ==
- National anthem of Anguilla
- North America
- Northern Hemisphere

== O ==
- Organisation of Eastern Caribbean States (OECS)

== P ==
- Politics of Anguilla
  - List of political parties in Anguilla
- Public holidays in Anguilla

== S ==
- Sailing in Anguilla

== T ==
- The Valley – Capital of Anguilla
- Topic outline of Anguilla
- Transport in Anguilla

== U ==
- United Kingdom of Great Britain and Northern Ireland

== V ==
- The Valley, Anguilla

== W ==
- West Indies
- Western Hemisphere
- Wikimedia Atlas of Anguilla
- Wikipedia:WikiProject Topic outline/Drafts/Topic outline of Anguilla

== See also ==
- List of Caribbean-related topics
- List of international rankings
- Lists of country-related topics
- Outline of Anguilla
