= Law of Anguilla =

The law of Anguilla is a combination of common law and statute, and is based heavily upon English law.

Law in Anguilla tends to be a combination of the very old and the very new. As a budding offshore financial centre, Anguilla has several extremely modern statutes dealing with company law, insolvency, banking law, trust law, insurance, and other related matters. It has adopted the International Swaps and Derivatives Association model netting law. However, in other areas of law, such as family law, Anguilla's laws are based on older English statutes, which can pose difficulties in modern times. Other areas of law, such as international law, are essentially regulated externally through the Foreign and Commonwealth Office in London by Order in Council. A large portion of Anguilla's laws consists of the common law, which continually evolves through judicial precedent in the territory and in other common law countries.

Anguilla is a British Overseas Territory (dependent territory) of the United Kingdom. Although the local legislature and courts are independent from the United Kingdom, Anguilla's final appeals court is the Judicial Committee of the Privy Council in London, and the British Government deals with all international relations on behalf of the territory. Anguilla does not have a separate vote at the United Nations.

== See also ==
- Anguillan company law
- Anguillan bankruptcy law
- Arbitration in Anguilla
