= Warspite =

Warspite may refer to:

- Warspite, Alberta, Canada; a hamlet
- Mount Warspite, mountain summit located in Peter Lougheed Provincial Park
- HMS Warspite, a British Royal Navy ship name
- English ship Warspite (1596), a ship in the Tudor Dynasty English Navy
- Warspite (schooner), a transport schooner in the Anguilla trade, see Sailing in Anguilla
- Warspite (locomotive), #8 engine for the National Coal Board, s/n 3776, see List of preserved Hunslet Austerity 0-6-0ST locomotives

== See also ==
- War (disambiguation)
- Spite (disambiguation)
