= List of companies of Anguilla =

Location of Anguilla

Anguilla is a British overseas territory in the Caribbean.

Anguilla has become a popular tax haven, having no capital gains, estate, profit or other forms of direct taxation on either individuals or corporations. In April 2011, faced with a mounting deficit, it introduced a 3% "Interim Stabilisation Levy", Anguilla's first form of income tax.

== Notable firms ==
This list includes notable companies with primary headquarters located in the country. The industry and sector follow the Industry Classification Benchmark taxonomy. Organizations which have ceased operations are included and noted as defunct.

Notable companies Status: P=Private, S=State; A=Active, D=Defunct
Name	Industry	Sector	Headquarters	Founded	Notes	Status	
CuisinArt Resort and Spa	Consumer services	Hotels	Rendezvous Bay	1999	Hotel and resort	P	A
Trans Anguilla Airways	Consumer services	Airlines	The Valley	1996	Charter airline	P	A

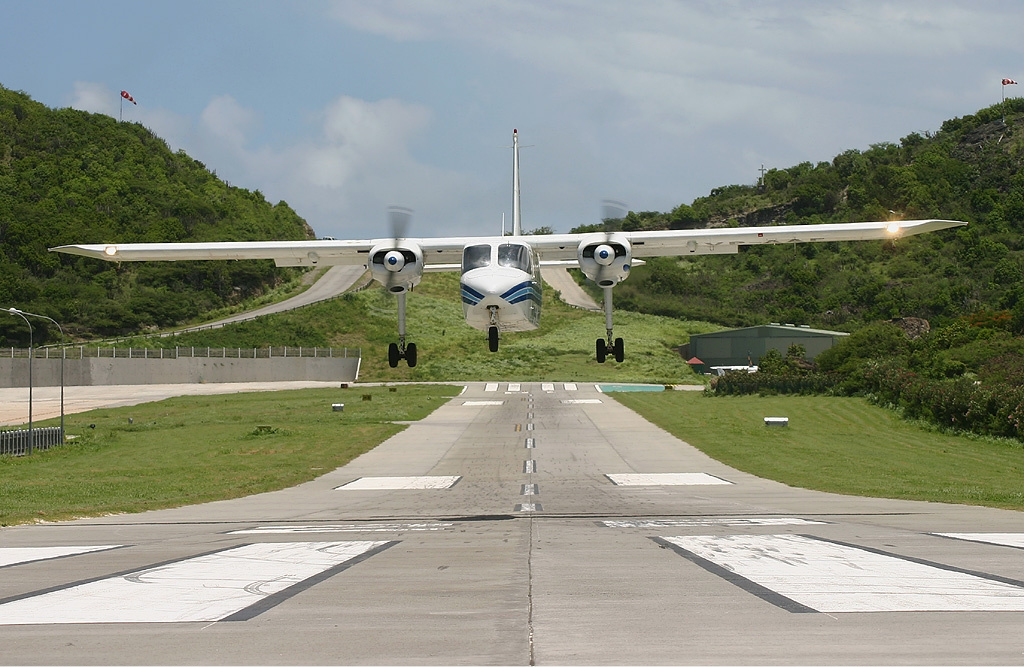
Trans Anguilla Airways Britten-Norman BN-2B-21 Islander.
