= Economy of Anguilla =

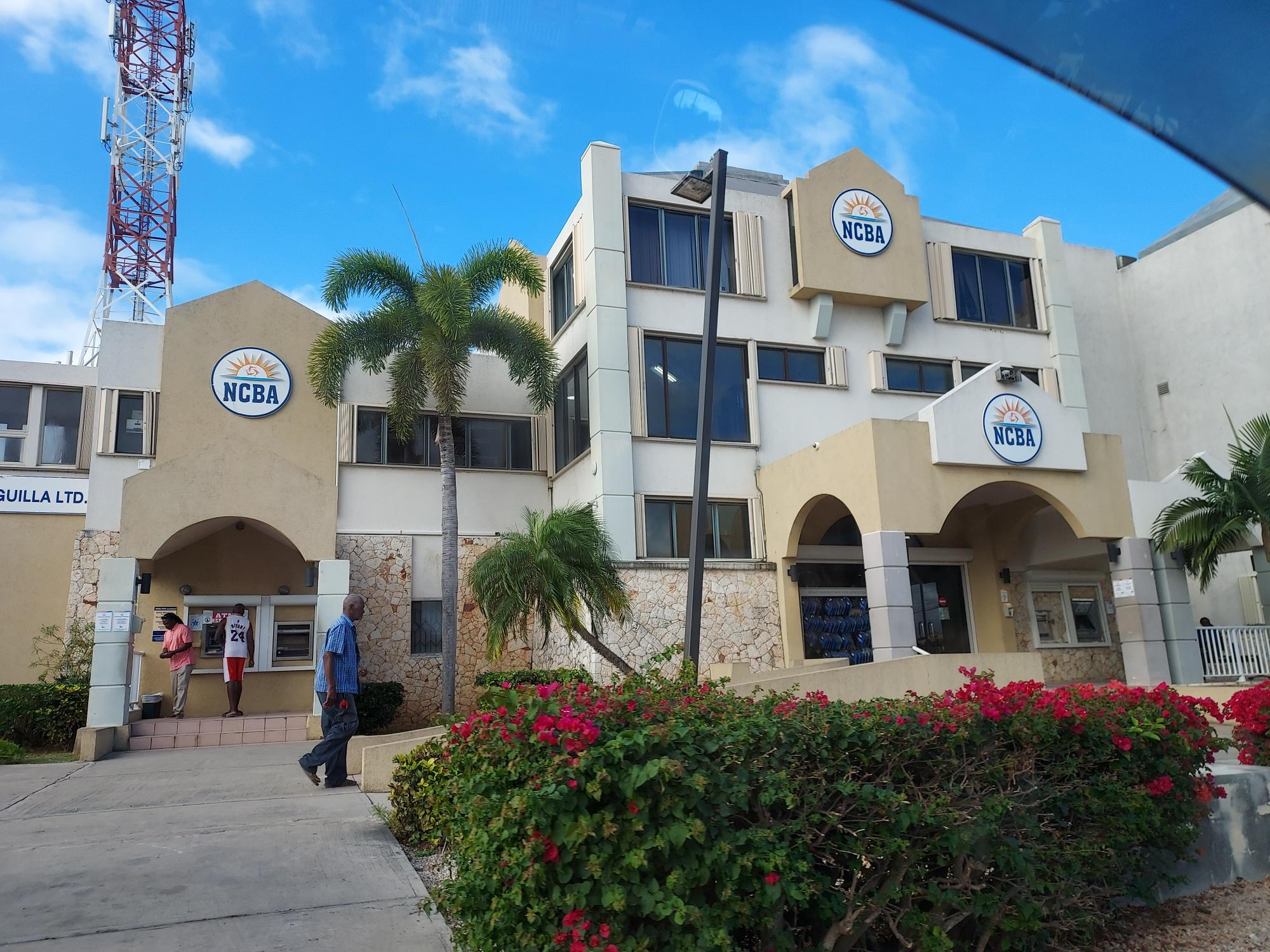
- Currency: East Caribbean dollar (XCD); 1 US$ = 2.7 XCD (2014)
- Fiscal year: 1 April – 31 March
- Trade organisations: OECS, CARICOM (associate)
- Country group: Developed/Advanced; High-income economy

Statistics
- GDP: -8.5% (2009 est.)
- GDP per capita: $12,200 (2008 est.)
- GDP by sector: agriculture: (2.6%) industry: (24.4%) services: (73%) (2014 est.)
- Inflation (CPI): 3.1% (2014 est.)
- Population below national poverty line: 23% (2002 est.)
- Labour force: 6,049 (2001 est.)
- Labour force by occupation: agriculture: 4%, industry: 21%, services: 75% (2000 est.)
- Unemployment: 8% (2002 est.)
- Main industries: tourism, boat building, offshore financial services

External
- Exports: $11.7 million (2014 est.)
- Export goods: lobster, fish, livestock, salt, concrete blocks, rum
- Main export partners: Chile 60%; Netherlands 8.21% (2023)
- Import goods: fuels, foodstuffs, manufactures, chemicals, trucks, textiles
- Main import partners: Chile 50.2%; United States 26.8%; Botswana 14.9% (2023)

Public finance
- Government debt: $8.8 million (1998)
- Economic aid: $9 million (2004)
- All values, unless otherwise stated, are in US dollars.

The economy of Anguilla depends heavily on luxury tourism, offshore banking, lobster fishing, and remittances from emigrants. Due to its small size, few natural resources, and reliance on tourism and foreign direct investment, Anguilla is vulnerable to external economic conditions in the United States, Canada and Europe. Therefore, economic growth in Anguilla can be very volatile. Anguilla's currency is the East Caribbean dollar, though the US dollar is also widely accepted. The exchange rate is fixed to the US dollar at US$1 = EC$2.70.

== History ==
In the 19th century, Anguilla's major product was salt produced by evaporation on the shores of the island's ponds, which was exported to the United States. Sugar, cotton, sweetcorn, and tobacco were also grown. By the beginning of World War I, the island had been almost entirely deforested by charcoal-burners. Most of the land was held by black sustenance farmers producing sweet potatoes, peas, beans, and corn and rearing sheep and goats. Salt continued to be exported to nearby Saint Thomas, along with phosphate of lime and cattle.

Modern Anguilla has focused its development on tourism, its related construction industry, and offshore finance. The first comprehensive financial services legislation was enacted in late 1994.

The economy, and especially the tourism sector, suffered a setback in late 1995 due to the effects of Hurricane Luis in September. Hotels were hit particularly hard but a recovery occurred the following year. Another economic setback occurred during the aftermath of Hurricane Lenny in 2000. Before the 2008 worldwide crisis, the economy of Anguilla was growing strongly, especially the tourism sector, which was driving major new developments in partnerships with multi-national companies. Anguilla's tourism industry received a major boost when it was selected to host the World Travel Awards in December 2014. Known as "the Oscars of the travel industry", the awards ceremony was held at the CuisinArt Resort and Spa and was hosted by Vivica A. Fox. Anguilla was voted the World's Leading Luxury Island Destination from a short list of top-tier candidates such as St. Barts, the Maldives, and Mauritius. The economy, including the tourism sector, suffered its biggest setback in late 2017 due to the effects of Hurricane Irma in September, which was the most powerful hurricane to hit the island and which caused major material damage of $320 million. A lot of infrastructure was damaged, which was repaired in 2018/19 and the economy began to recover in 2019. However, the onset of the COVID-19 pandemic in 2020/21, caused a setback in the economy.

Anguilla's financial system comprises seven banks, two money services businesses, more than 40 company managers, more than 50 insurers, 12 brokers, more than 250 captive intermediaries, more than 50 mutual funds, and eight trust companies. In 2013, the Eastern Caribbean Central Bank, the regulator of Anguilla's banks, took control over Anguilla's indigenous banks and in 2016, fleeced the foreign depositors to prop up Anguilla's banking system and make local depositors whole.

Anguilla has become a popular tax haven, having no capital gains, estate, profit, sales, or corporate taxes. In April 2011, faced with a mounting deficit, it introduced a 3% "Interim Stabilisation Levy", Anguilla's first form of income tax. Anguilla also has a 0.75% property tax.

Anguilla aims to obtain 15% of its energy from solar power to become less reliant on expensive imported diesel. The Climate & Development Knowledge Network is helping the government gather the information it needs to change the territory's legislation, so that it can integrate renewables into its grid. Barbados has also made good progress in switching to renewables, but many other Small Island Developing States are still at the early stages of planning how to integrate renewable energy into their grids. "For a small island we're very far ahead," said Beth Barry, Coordinator of the Anguilla Renewable Energy Office. "We've got an Energy Policy and a draft Climate Change policy and have been focusing efforts on the question of sustainable energy supply for several years now. As a result, we have a lot of information we can share with other islands."

According to a Bloomberg report, due to a skyrocketing interest in artificial intelligence, Anguilla was expected to profit in 2023 from a surge in demand for web addresses ending with the country's top-level domain .ai. The total number of registrations of .ai domain names had already doubled in 2022, and according to Vince Cate, who has managed the top-level domain, Anguilla will bring in as much as $30 million in domain-registration fees for 2023.

== Overview ==
Major industries in Anguilla include tourism, boat building, and offshore financial services. In 1997 there was an industrial production growth rate of 3.1%.

42.6 GWh of electricity are consumed, produced entirely by fossil fuel.

Agricultural products include small quantities of tobacco, vegetables, and cattle raising.

In 2011, Anguilla was the fifth-largest jurisdiction for Captive Insurance, after Bermuda, the Cayman Islands, Vermont and Guernsey. Captive insurance forms part of Anguilla's financial services industry, and several captive management firms have opened offices on the island.

== Sectors ==
=== Transport ===
One of the British overseas territories, the Caribbean island of Anguilla measures only 16 miles (26 km) long by 3 miles (4.8 km) wide, so transport is simpler than in many countries. There is no public transport, such as bus or rail systems, since there isn't enough need. However, Anguilla's roads are better maintained than on many Caribbean islands.

Cars are the main means of transport, with driving on the left-hand side of the road, as in the United Kingdom. Although speed limits rarely exceed 30 miles (48 km) per hour and traffic moves slowly, with the island's small size it doesn't take long to get anywhere. Taxi service is unmetered, with set rates published in tourist guides. In addition to regular transport, taxis often offer island tours lasting several hours. Fares must be paid in cash.

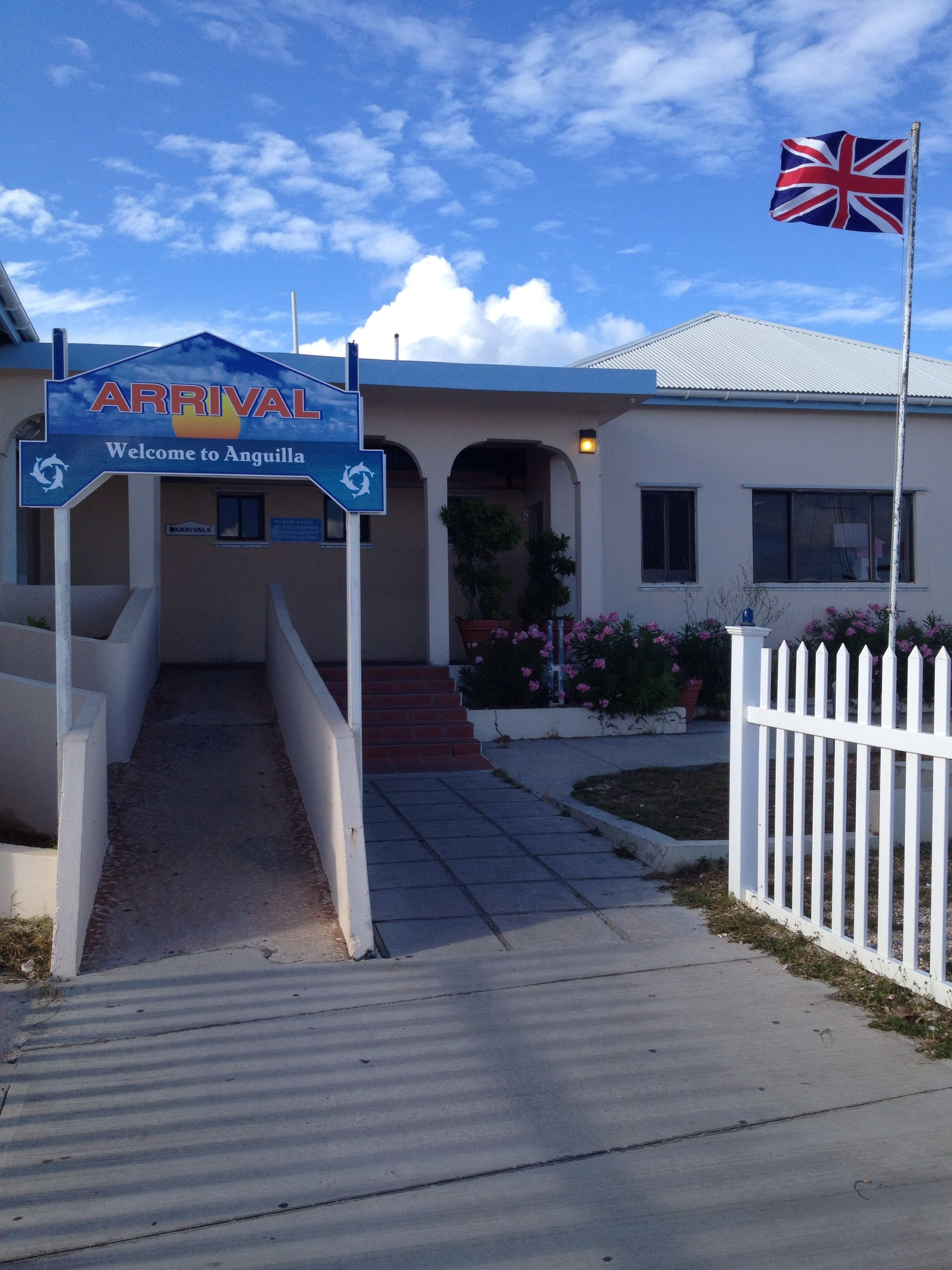
Ferry Terminal, Blowing Point

Ferries offer transport from Anguilla to other islands. The ferry from Blowing Point to Marigot, St. Martin, known to the locals as the Haddad Express, runs all day on the half-hour, into the night time. With no reservations required, taking the ferry is simple and inexpensive. Ferries can also be chartered to other destinations. One such Charter Service is from Blowing Point, Anguilla to Princess Juliana Airport to make travel easier.

Other means of transport include bicycles, mopeds, motorcycles and walking. Because of the territory's small land mass and flatter terrain, these methods make more sense on Anguilla than on many other Caribbean islands.

Cars, bikes, mopeds and motorcycles are all available for rental at reasonable prices. Both well-known car rental agencies and local companies operate rental businesses. Groups may also charter a private bus for excursions.

A railway was built to support phosphate mining on Sombrero Island.

=== Education ===
Education in Anguilla is compulsory between the ages of 5 and 17. In 1998, the gross primary enrollment rate was 100.7 percent, and the net primary enrollment rate was 98.9 percent. The government has collaborated with UNESCO to develop an Education for All plan that aims to raise educational achievement levels, improve access to quality special education services and provide human resource training for teachers and education managers.

=== Healthcare ===
Health in Anguilla is managed by the Health Authority of Anguilla, an agency of the Government of Anguilla.
