= Spiteful =

Spiteful may refer to:

- HMS Spiteful, various Royal Navy ships
- Spiteful-class destroyer, a Royal Navy class of two destroyers built in 1898 and 1899
- USS Thistle (1862), a Union Army American Civil War steamer originally the Army tug Spiteful
- Supermarine Spiteful, a fighter intended to replace the Spitfire, but made obsolete by jet aircraft

== Entertainment ==
- Spiteful, album by Sonny Vincent & Spite 2014
- "Spiteful" (PartyNextDoor song), song by PartyNextDoor

== See also ==
- Spite (disambiguation)
