= Spight =

Spight is a surname. Notable people with the surname include:

- Alexis Spight (born 1993), American urban contemporary gospel musician
- Thomas Spight (1841–1924), American politician

== See also ==
- Spite (disambiguation)
