= Anguillian =

Anguillian may refer to:

- Something of, from, or related to Anguilla, a British overseas territory in the Caribbean
  - Demographics of Anguilla
  - Culture of Anguilla
- Anguillian Creole, the language spoken in Anguilla
- Anguillian cuisine
