= List of universities in Anguilla =

This is a list of universities in Anguilla.

== Universities ==
- New Anglia University - Anguilla campus
- Saint James School of Medicine - Anguilla campus
- University of the West Indies - Anguilla campus
- Design Studies Institute - Anguilla campus
- Global Humanistic University AI - First Anguilla Online University

== See also ==
- List of universities by country
