= Spite =

Spite may refer to:

- Spite (sentiment), to intentionally annoy, hurt, or upset without self-benefit
- Spite (game theory), a phenomenon in fair division economics problems
- Spite (punk band), a hardcore punk band from Michigan
- Spite (deathcore band), a deathcore band formed in 2014 in Bay Area, California
- Spite plateau, a baseline in the abundance of lithium found in old stars orbiting the galactic halo

== See also ==
- Spite fence, an overly-tall fence erected between two adjacent lots
- Spite house, a building constructed specifically because someone does not want it there
- Cutting off the nose to spite the face
- Appeal to spite
- Spiteful (disambiguation)
- Warspite (disambiguation)
- Spight
