= New Anglia University =

Private university and medical school in Anguilla

Coordinates: 18.2030°N 63.0686°W

- Type: Private university
- Location: George Hill, Anguilla
- Language: English
- Website: newanglia.com

New Anglia University is a private university in Anguilla, a British Overseas Territory in the Caribbean. The university offers a four-year Doctor of Medicine (MD) programme through its School of Medicine. The Government of Anguilla lists New Anglia University among the territory's recognised and licensed higher education institutions.

The New Anglia University School of Medicine is listed in the World Directory of Medical Schools (WDOMS). The directory records the school as private and currently operational and records 2024 as the year in which medical instruction began.

== History ==
The World Directory of Medical Schools records 2024 as the year in which medical instruction began at New Anglia University.

In January 2025, the Government of Anguilla's Executive Council approved an application by New Anglia University Ltd for customs-duty concessions on equipment and materials used to support the provision of medical education. The decision noted that the university and the Government of Anguilla had an existing memorandum of understanding.

The university's campus in George Hill was formally inaugurated on 11 January 2025. Anguilla Focus reported on the opening of the medical school and its ribbon-cutting ceremony. The opening was also documented by the Government of Anguilla, which reported that Premier Ellis L. Webster and members of Cabinet attended the ceremony alongside university faculty, staff and students.

On 10 January 2026, the university held a White Coat Ceremony for its inaugural cohort of medical students. The Anguillian reported that the ceremony was attended by Governor Julia Crouch, Premier Cora Richardson-Hodge and Minister of Health Cardigan Connor, alongside university faculty, students and their families.

== Academics ==
=== Doctor of Medicine programme ===
The School of Medicine offers a four-year programme leading to the Doctor of Medicine degree. The World Directory of Medical Schools records the programme duration as four years and English as its language of instruction.

The MD programme is divided into Basic Sciences and Clinical Sciences phases. Students undertake approximately 20 months of Basic Sciences education at the university's campus in Anguilla before progressing to the clinical component of the programme.

The university also offers a premedical pathway for students requiring additional academic preparation before entering the medical programme.

=== Clinical education ===
The Clinical Sciences phase comprises 72 weeks of supervised clinical education. The curriculum includes core rotations in internal medicine, surgery, paediatrics, obstetrics and gynaecology, psychiatry and family medicine, together with elective rotations.

Clinical education is undertaken at affiliated healthcare institutions. The university lists more than 45 affiliated hospitals and clinical sites in the United States and United Kingdom.

The World Directory of Medical Schools records that the School of Medicine has access to clinical teaching facilities.

== Admissions ==
New Anglia University admits students through graduate-entry and premedical pathways.

For direct entry to the four-year MD programme, the World Directory of Medical Schools records an undergraduate degree as an academic admission requirement. WDOMS also records that international students are admitted and that an entrance examination is not required.

WDOMS records three annual entry points for the medical programme, in January, May and September.

== Financial aid ==
New Anglia University offers scholarships and need-based financial assistance and facilitates access to private student financing for eligible students.

Private student-financing arrangements are available to eligible students from a number of countries, including the United States and United Kingdom. Depending on the financing arrangement and individual eligibility, funding may cover tuition fees and living expenses.

== Recognition and membership ==
=== Government of Anguilla ===
The Government of Anguilla lists New Anglia University among the jurisdiction's recognised and licensed higher education institutions.

=== World Directory of Medical Schools ===
New Anglia University School of Medicine is listed in the World Directory of Medical Schools under FAIMER School ID F0008660. WDOMS records the school as private and currently operational.

The school's WDOMS entry contains sponsor notes relating to international medical certification and registration pathways.

The Educational Commission for Foreign Medical Graduates (ECFMG) sponsor note states that students and graduates of the school are eligible to apply for ECFMG Certification, subject to meeting the applicable eligibility requirements. WDOMS lists graduation years from 2028 to current for this purpose.

The WDOMS entry also contains a sponsor note from the Medical Council of Canada concerning the acceptability of medical degrees to provincial and territorial medical regulatory authorities in Canada, subject to the applicable requirements.

=== Quality Assurance Agency membership ===
New Anglia University is a member of the UK's Quality Assurance Agency for Higher Education (QAA). The university appears in QAA's published membership directory.

QAA membership is distinct from institutional or programme accreditation.

== Research ==
Researchers using a New Anglia University affiliation have contributed to academic publications and conference research in areas including psychiatry, neuroscience, molecular medicine, endocrinology and applications of artificial intelligence in medicine.

Research carrying a Department of Clinical Sciences, New Anglia University affiliation has appeared in the peer-reviewed journal Diagnostics.

Researchers listing New Anglia University among their institutional affiliations have also published in the International Journal of Molecular Sciences.

Research carrying a New Anglia University affiliation has also been indexed in PubMed.

Researchers using a New Anglia University affiliation have also contributed work published in Endocrine Abstracts.

Other published work carrying a New Anglia University affiliation has examined radiation-induced changes in salivary proteins in oral cancer.

== Campus and student life ==
New Anglia University's campus is located in George Hill, Anguilla. The World Directory of Medical Schools records the School of Medicine's address as 203 The Rogers Office Building, Edwin Wallace Rey Drive, George Hill.

The university also maintains admissions offices in London and New York City.

The experience of international students relocating to Anguilla to study at New Anglia University has received coverage in the British media. In 2025, the Daily Mirror published a feature on a British student who moved from the United Kingdom to Anguilla to study medicine at New Anglia University. The report discussed the student's move to the Caribbean, accommodation, student life and the financial considerations associated with studying medicine overseas.

== Institutional identifiers and indexing ==
New Anglia University has an institutional identifier in the Research Organization Registry (ROR), an international registry providing persistent identifiers for research organisations.

The university also has an institutional record in OpenAlex, an open catalogue of scholarly works, authors and research institutions.

The university is included in Webometrics Global Web Rankings for Universities, which maintains an institutional ranking record for New Anglia University.

== See also ==
- Education in Anguilla
- List of medical schools in the Caribbean
- List of universities in Anguilla
- Medical education
