= Ijahnya Christian =

Anguillian pan-African and Rastafari activist

- Born: Carol Patricia Rey; January 31, 1957 (age 69); The Valley, Anguilla, British West Indies
- Died: April 27, 2020 (aged 62–63); St. Kitts and Nevis, West Indies
- Occupations: Social Activist and Writer
- Years active: 1980 - 2020
- Known for: Pan-Africanism, Rastafari organizing
- Children: 4, Psyche Dean Young, Joanne C. Liburd, Wolde Christian and Judah Christian

Ijahnya Christian (January 31, 1957 – April 27, 2020) was an Afro-Anguillian social activist and noted member of the Rastafarian community. As a member of the pan-African and repatriation movements, Christian traveled worldwide to help preserve the African languages, traditions, and heritage of the diaspora and encouraged study on the history and culture of Caribbean communities.

== Early life ==
Ijahnya Christian was born Carol Patricia Rey January 31, 1957 in The Valley, Anguilla to Amethyst and Hugh Rey, a civil servant. Her childhood was spent on each of the three islands of the colony and she graduated from Basseterre High School in St. Kitts in the year 1976. While she was a teenager, she became interested in the Rastafarian movement sweeping through the Caribbean after Haile Selassie's 1966 visit to the region and Bob Marley's music added visibility to the ideology. She joined the movement in 1980, changed her name to Ijahnya Christian, and went on to study social work at the University of the West Indies in Mona, Jamaica, graduating with a bachelor's degree in 1984.

== Career ==
Returning to Anguilla, Christian began her career as a high school teacher. Simultaneously, she began editing working on two ethnographic projects. She served as mentor and editor for Lottis Hodge's Ning Troubles and The Dictionary of Anguillian Language. Hodge's autobiographical work, published in 1988, detailed how she overcame the difficulties of her life. The Anguillian Dictionary, published in 1993, was the first work to focus on the linguistic heritage of the island. During the same timeframe, Christian was pursuing a Master's degree in Education at the University of Southampton, in Southampton, England, which she completed in 1991.

In 2010, Christian founded the Athlyi Rogers Study Centre. The centre, named after the Anguillian writer Robert Athlyi Rogers, who wrote the Holy Piby, a text on Rastafari theology, was a pan-African cultural space. To further her aim of increasing both popular and scholarly attention on Anguillian identity and history, she served as Director of the Department of Youth and Culture from 2004 to 2006. Between 1998 and 2009, she also wrote a regular column for The Anguillian, "Heartically Yours", which discussed cultural and political events on the island.

Christian was a representative for the Caribbean Pan-African Network, speaking on the preservation of language, Caribbean music—including a range from Calypso, Chutney Soca, Reggae to Gospel—and heritage. She was a founding member of the Caribbean Rastafari Organization and became one of the principal organizers of worldwide gatherings of the Rastafari faithful. Christian moved to Shashemene, Ethiopia in 2010, to further her work in repatriating the African diaspora to the mother country, from where she continued her writing and social activism. It was her belief that repatriation is protected under the United Nations principal and laws governing the right of return.
