= Arbitration in Anguilla =

Arbitration in Anguilla is regulated principally by the Arbitration Act (Cap A.105).

== Text of the Arbitration Act ==
The Arbitration Act is believed to be the shortest statute in Anguilla. The text of the statute, in its entirety, consists of:

Arbitration Act (UK) to apply to Anguilla
1. The Arbitration Act (14 Geo. 6 c. 27) (UK) as amended from time to time shall be, and the same is hereby declared to be henceforth, in force in Anguilla, and all the provisions of the Act, so far as the same are applicable, shall mutatis mutandis apply to all proceedings relating to arbitration within Anguilla.
Citation
2. This Act may be cited as the Arbitration Act, Revised Statutes of Anguilla, Chapter A105.

The purpose of the Act is to apply the British Arbitration Act, 1950 to Anguilla. The 1950 Arbitration Act has now been repealed in its entirety in the United Kingdom. The last remaining parts of the Act which were in force were repealed by the Arbitration Act, 1996.

There are three schools of thought in relation to the proper interpretation of the provisions.

- The first, and most popular, is the more purposive interpretation is that the words "as amended from time to time" should be construed broadly, and that the references to the 1950 Act should be construed as references to the statute that replaced it: the Arbitration Act, 1996.
- The second is that the repeal of the various provisions of the 1950 Act means that de facto there is no longer any statute regulating arbitration in Anguilla.
- The third is that an absolute interpretation should be taken, and that "amendment" should be limited to amendments, and does not include either repeal or re-enactment. Accordingly, although the provisions were repealed in the United Kingdom they were not amended, and therefore should be treated as still being in force in Anguilla.

In Vento v Fidelity Insurance Co Ltd the Eastern Caribbean Court of Appeal affirmed that the effect of the legislation was to import the 1996 Act, as amended, in to Anguillan law.

== New York Convention, Geneva Protocol and Convention ==
Anguilla is not a party to the 1958 New York Convention. However, Anguilla is still a party to the Geneva Convention on the Execution of Foreign Arbitral Awards and the Protocol on Arbitration Clauses, both of which were extended by the United Kingdom to St. Christopher and Nevis, of which Anguilla originally was a part. The United Nations Treaty Series shows the following statement of the British government of 16 December 1985: "At the time of accession, Anguilla was part of the territory of St. Christopher and Nevis. By 1978, Anguilla had a separate constitutional status, as part of the St. Christopher and Nevis/Anguilla group. St. Christopher and Nevis became independent on September 19, 1983 and Anguilla then reverted to being a dependant territory of the United Kingdom. Therefore, the Convention continues to apply to Anguilla."
