= Anguillan bankruptcy law =

Anguillan bankruptcy law regulates the position of individuals and companies who are unable to meet their financial obligations.

Bankruptcy of individuals is usually referred to as "personal bankruptcy" in Anguilla, whereas the bankruptcy of corporations is referred to as "corporate insolvency". The legislation largely deals with both separately, although there are some common provisions.

== Personal bankruptcy ==
Personal bankruptcy is regulated under the Bankruptcy Act (Cap B.15). Under that statute, a person commits an act of bankruptcy if he or she:

1. makes a conveyance or assignment of his property to a trustee or trustees for the benefit of his creditors generally;
2. makes a fraudulent conveyance, gift, delivery, or transfer of his property, or any part thereof;
3. makes any conveyance or transfer of his property, or any part thereof, or creates any charge thereon, which would under this or any other Act be void as a fraudulent preference if he were adjudged bankrupt;
4. with intent to defeat or delay his creditors he departs out of Anguilla, or being out of Anguilla remains out of Anguilla, or departs from his dwelling house, or otherwise absents himself, or begins to keep house;
5. execution having issued against him, has been levied by seizure and sale of his goods under process in an action in any court, or in any civil proceeding;
6. if any judgment debt has been ordered by the Court to be levied upon any lands or any mortgage, encumbrance or interest in or upon such land;
7. files in the Court a declaration of his inability to pay his debts, or presents a bankruptcy petition against himself or herself;
8. if a creditor has obtained a final judgment against him for any amount, and execution thereon not having been stayed, and he does not, within the time provided, either comply with the requirements of the notice, or satisfy the Court that he has a counterclaim, set off or cross demand which equals or exceeds the amount of the judgment debt;
9. if the debtor gives notice to any of his creditors that he has suspended, or that he is about to suspend, payment of his debts; or
10. if the debtor has in fact suspended payment of his debts and given notice to any of his creditors that he is insolvent.

If any of those conditions are made out, then the court may make a "receiving order" (which is the name for what is ordinarily called a bankruptcy order in Anguilla). On the making of a receiving order a receiver is constituted "receiver" of the property of the debtor, and thereafter no creditor to whom the debtor is indebted in respect of any debt provable in bankruptcy shall have any remedy against the debtor in respect of the debt or shall commence any action or other legal proceedings unless with the leave of the Court, and on such terms as the Court may impose. Thereafter a meeting of creditors is convened, and they may by resolution of 75% of creditors in value seek to implement an arrangement or compromise in relation to the debts of the bankrupt. If the meeting is not successful in implementing a scheme, then the court will appoint a trustee in bankruptcy who will divide the property of the bankrupt between his creditors in the discharge of their claims.

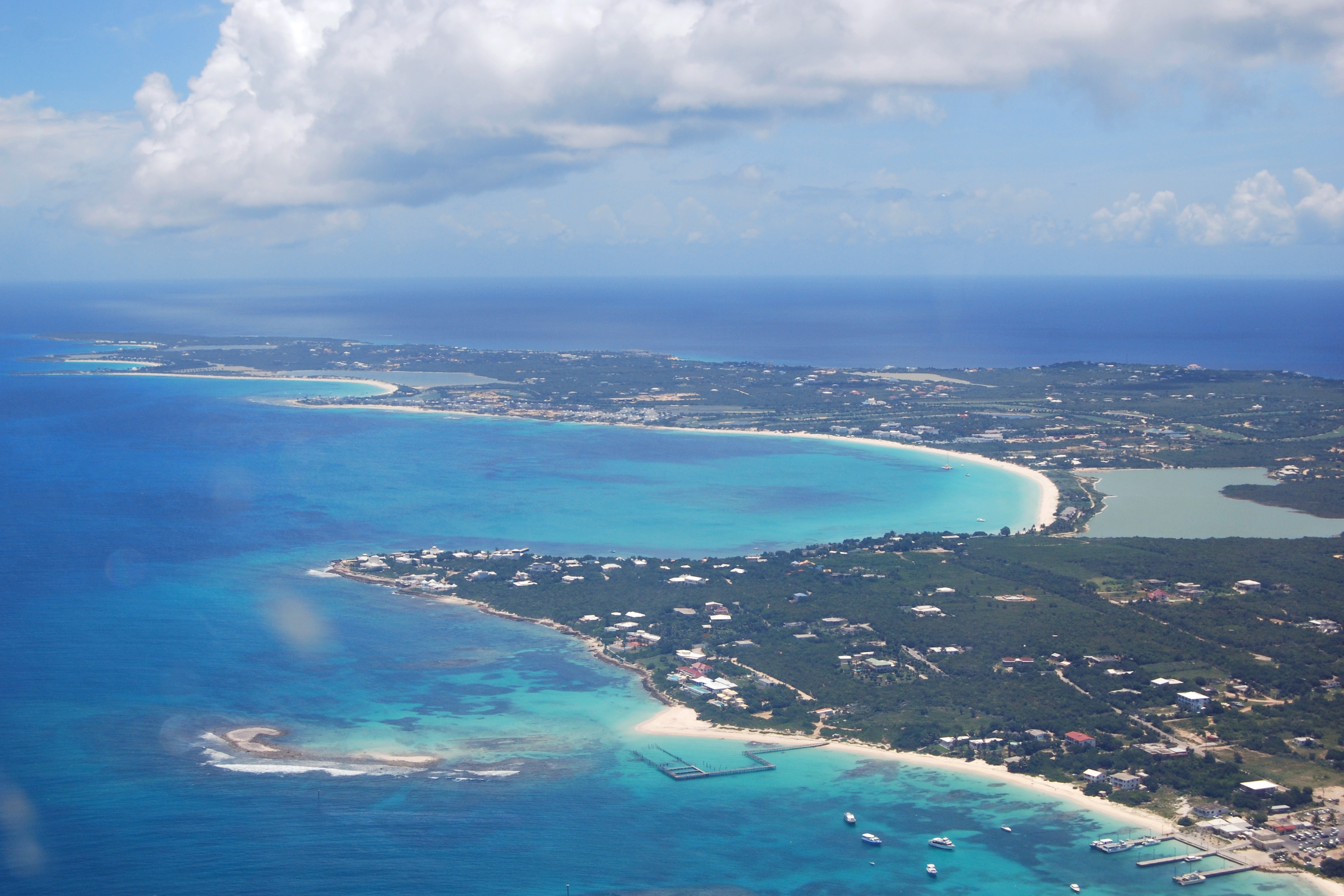
Anguilla.

== Corporate insolvency ==
Anguillan corporate insolvency law is presently highly fragmented, with various different parts of appearing in either the Bankruptcy Act (Cap B.15) or the Companies Act (Cap C.65). However, the matrix of laws is nonetheless fragmentary and incomplete. At present there are no provisions under Anguillan law in relation to corporate insolvency which address insolvency set-off, or the avoidance of dispositions after the commencement of winding-up. There are also no powers conferred upon the liquidator specifically relating to challenging transactions entered into the "twilight" period which prejudice the general body of creditors, but there is limited scope to seek redress for such transactions outside of the insolvency regime under the Fraudulent Dispositions Act (Cap F.60).

However, the legislature is currently considering a comprehensive new Insolvency Act which will both close all of the relevant gaps in the law, and consolidate all related laws relating to both corporate insolvency and personal bankruptcy into a single statute.

Where a liquidator over a company is appointed (either voluntarily or by the court), the liquidator's primary duty is to collect in all of the company's assets and then distribute them pari passu to the company's creditors. The law confers wide powers upon the liquidator to enable him to do so. Once a liquidator is appointed, unsecured creditors cannot commence legal proceedings against the insolvent company without the leave of the court, and any rights of action against the company are converted into claims in the liquidation process. Any disposition of property by the company after the commencement of winding-up is void unless the court otherwise orders.

Secured creditors generally do not participate in the liquidation process, and may continue to proceed with any enforcement action directly against their collateral pursuant to a valid security interest.

Anguillan law provides for statutory netting relating to financial contracts under the Netting Act (Cap N.03), and this will prevail over any other off provisions arising by law.
