= List of football clubs in Anguilla =

This is a list of association football clubs in Anguilla, including senior men's and senior women's teams.

== Senior men's teams ==
=== As of 2006 ===
- Anguilla Under-20
- Attackers
- Full Monty
- Jam Boyz
- Kicks United FC
- Roaring Lions FC
- Spartan International

=== Other teams ===
- Cool Runnings FC
- Dolphins
- First Anguilla Trust
- JT Stars

== Senior women's teams ==
=== As of 2006 ===
- Gazelles
- Lil's Super Stars
- Lil's Soldiers
- Shining Stars
- Youngsters

=== Other teams ===
- Manchester United
