= Aurora Anguilla =

Resort hotel in Anguilla

Coordinates: 18°10′42.59″N 63°07′00.52″W

- Interactive map of the Aurora Anguilla area

General information
- Location: South Hill, Anguilla

Website
- https://www.auroraanguilla.com/

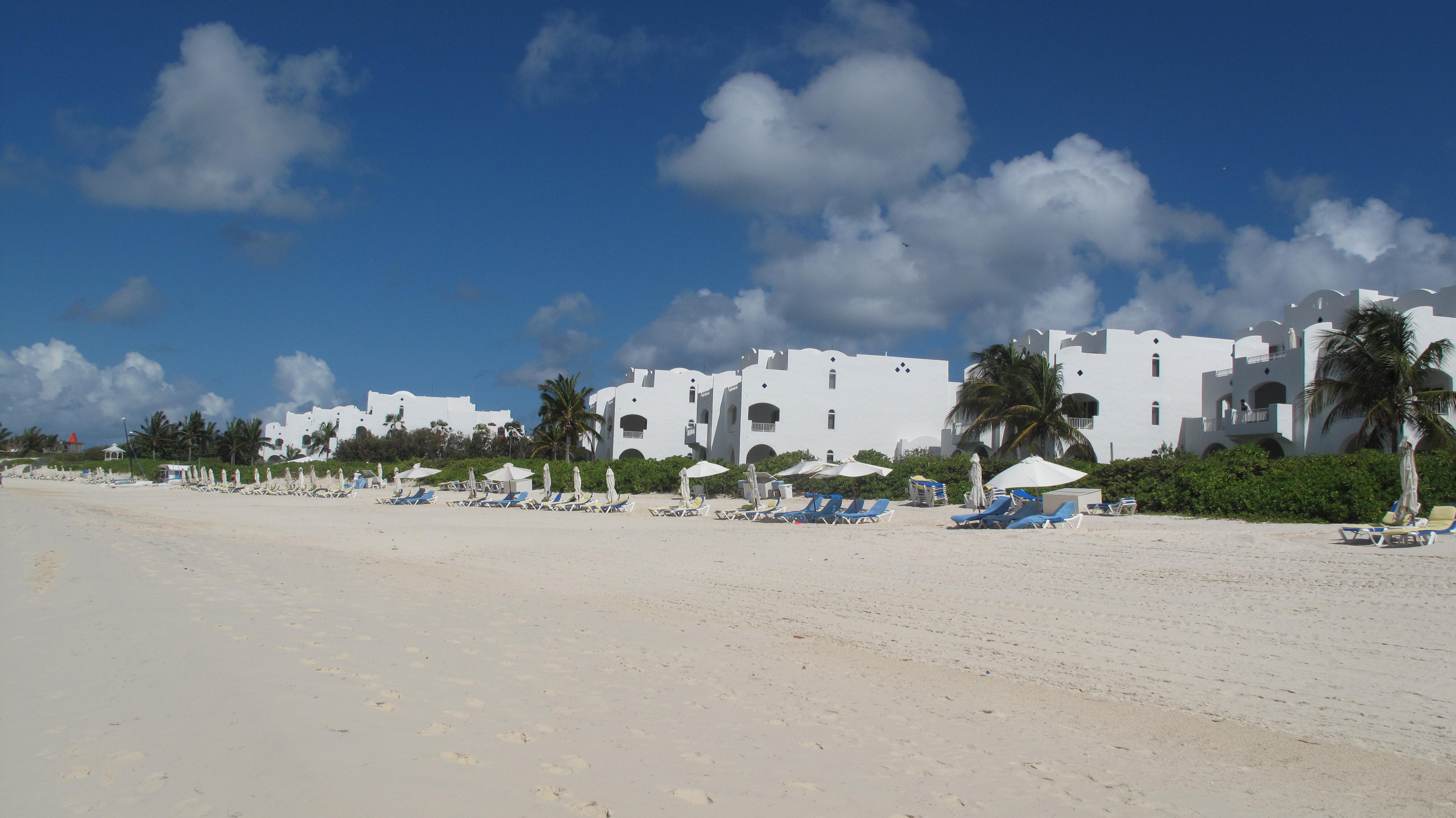
CuisinArt in 2009

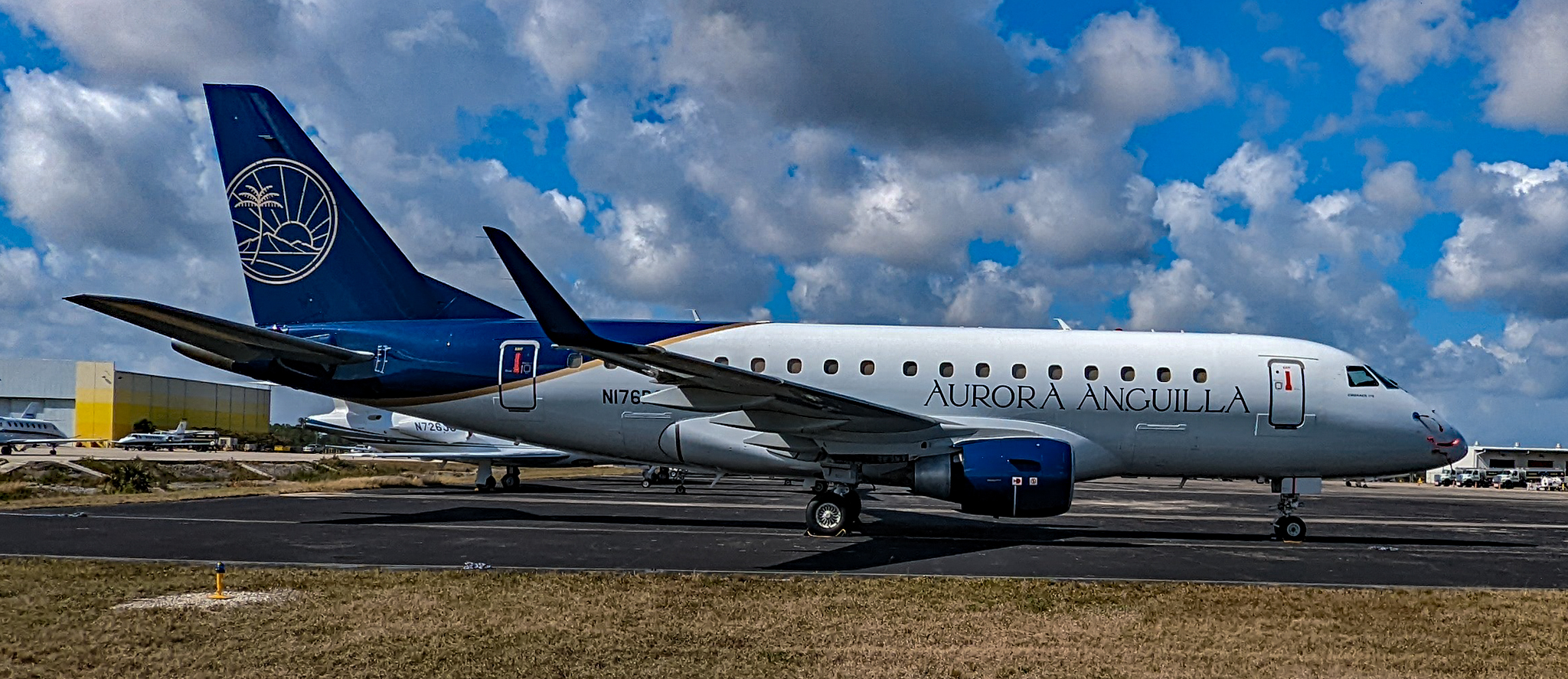
Aurora Anguilla charter flight

Aurora Anguilla is a five-star resort hotel in South Hill, Anguilla. Until 2021, it was known as the CuisinArt Resort and Spa.

It was founded after Leandro Rizzuto, owner of Conair Corporation and its subsidiary Cuisinart, purchased the property with the intention of making it a private home. However, since Anguilla does not permit foreigners to build beachfront homes, he chose to make it a hotel instead. It opened in November 1999. James Rittenhouse was responsible for the original design while he was the design manager for Conair.

It was sold to Richard M. Schulze's Olympus Ventures around 2020. Salamander Hotels and Resorts took over management in April 2022.

== Activities ==
At the resort there is a waterpark with 3 large slides, a lazy river and a smaller "waterpark" for young kids. Right next to the waterpark is an amphitheatre that hosts live music and events from popular local singers and bands (like Sprocka), and on Fridays and Saturdays, movies are playing. There are 6 restaurants; Those restaurants are called Chef's Table, C Level, D Richard's, Tokyo Bay, Breezes and Sole di Mare and two cafés; Rendezvous Café and Merrywing Café.
