= Anguillan company law =

Regional corporate legislation

Anguillan company law is primarily codified in three principal statutes:

1. the International Business Companies Act (Cap I.20);
2. the Companies Act (Cap C.65); and
3. the Limited Liability Companies Act (Cap L.65).

The Companies Act is generally reserved for companies engaged in business physically in Anguilla, and companies formed under it are generally referred to as either "CACs" (an acronym for Companies Act Companies) or "ABCs" (an acronym for Anguillan Business Company). The other two statutes relate to the incorporation of non-resident companies as part of the Territory's financial services industry. Companies incorporated under International Business Companies Act are called International Business Companies (or, more usually, "IBCs"). IBCs represent the largest number of companies in Anguilla. Companies incorporated under Limited Liability Companies Act are called Limited Liability Companies, and are also commonly referred to by their three-letter acronym, "LLCs".

== Registering a company ==
In practice, all companies formed in Anguilla are ordinarily incorporated by a trust company. Because all companies are required to have a licensed registered agent, and only trust companies are so licensed, in practice they control the incorporation procedure.

Technically any person may incorporate an IBC or a CAC by subscribing and filing the Articles of Incorporation, but as all IBCs and CACs are required by law to maintain a registered agent at all times, in practice the registered agent will invariable deal with the incorporation procedure. Similarly any person may form an LLC by subscribing the Articles of Formation, but because all LLCs are required at all times to have a registered agent, this process is usually undertaken by that agent.

All IBCs must be incorporated as companies limited by shares. A CAC may be incorporated as either (1) a company limited by shares, (2) a company limited by guarantee, or (3) a company limited by shares and by guarantee.

== Corporate personality ==
In Anguilla a company has separate legal personality from its members (unlike, for example, a partnership registered under the Limited Partnership Act (Cap L.70) or otherwise regulated by the Partnership Act (Cap P.05)).

The members of a company is not liable for the debts or obligations of the company. Similarly, directors or officers of a company are not normally liable for the company's debts except insofar as they may otherwise be liable for their own conduct or actions. The primary circumstances where liability may be imposed upon directors in relation to their acts as directors are (1) where the director is guilty of fraudulent trading or misfeasance, or (2) where the director undertakes personal responsibility or liability for certain actions.

Conversely, the assets of a company are regarded as belonging solely to the company and not the company's members. In exception circumstances the courts are prepared to "pierce the corporate veil" and treat the assets of the company as belonging to the members (or, conversely, treat the company's obligations as the obligations of the members), but the circumstances in which this will be done are rare and exceptional.

== Corporate constitution ==
The corporate constitution of an Anguillan company depends upon which statute it is incorporated under.

- For an International Business Company they are the Articles of Incorporation and the by-laws. The Articles of Incorporation are publicly filed upon incorporation, but they are a relatively perfunctory document containing very little information beyond the name of the company, the registered office and registered agent, and particulars of the authorised share capital. The regulation of the company's affairs is primarily delegated to the by-laws which are a private document not accessible by the public which are maintained at the company's registered office.
- For a private company registered under the Companies Act they also consist of the Articles of Incorporation and by-laws.
- For a limited liability company they are the Articles of Formation and the LLC agreement. Similar to IBCs, the Articles of Formation are publicly filed upon registration, but they are a relatively perfunctory document containing very little information beyond the name of the company, the registered office and registered agent. The principal regulation of the company's affairs is primarily delegated to the LLC agreement which is a private document not accessible by the public which are maintained at the company's registered office.

The Articles of Incorporation (or Formation) of a company are filed with the Companies Registry but are not available for public inspection. However, the by-laws or LLC agreement are private, and not available to the public. In each case the constitutional documents may be amended without a court application, but where the document is publicly filed, the amendment will normally need to also be publicly filed before it becomes effective.

For IBCs and CACs the Articles of incorporation and by-laws will bind the company and each member of the company as if they had been executed by them personally. There is no equivalent provision for LLCs.

== Corporate governance ==
The business and affairs of an Anguillan company are usually managed by its board of directors. The board must consist of one or more persons, and these may be individuals or companies. Directors owe strict duties of good faith to exercise their powers for a proper purpose and in the best interests of the company. The Companies Law is almost entirely silent in relation to the position of the directors, and the relevant legal principles are all derived from the common law.

The members of the company are legally the owners of the company. Although they do not have the power to dictate to the directors how the company should be managed, they have the power to appoint and remove the board, the through this power they exercise indirect control. Resolutions may be passed by the members formally or informally pursuant to the Duomatic principle.

There are no special statutory provisions to protect minority shareholders against "unfair prejudice" on the part of majority shareholders. Accordingly, minority shareholders who are prejudiced in this have to rely upon the common law exceptions to the rule set in Foss v Harbottle, or seek a winding-up of the company on just and equitable grounds.

The directors owe their duties to the company itself, and not to the individual members. Accordingly, where a director acts in breach of their duty, then the proper claimant in any action is the company itself. If the company is unable to take any action (because it is controlled by the wrongdoer) the court may authorise a member to bring proceedings in the name of the company by way of derivative action. However the measure of damages will be the loss to the company, and only the loss to the company. A shareholder cannot sue a person for a wrong committed against the company for the "reflective loss" to the value of their shareholding, as this would result in the wrongdoer paying double compensation for the same wrong (once to the company and once to the shareholders).

The emphasis of Cayman Islands company law is to protect the rights of creditors and members (i.e. the sources of capital) as the key stakeholders in the company. The rights of other stakeholders, such as employees, customers and wider society are given comparatively little protection. This reflects the offshore nature of most Cayman Islands companies, and the different social and economic environments in which they operate.

== Shares, equity interests and members ==
IBCs can only be formed as share issuing companies. Although CACs can be formed as guarantee companies, in practice almost all companies are registered as share issuing companies. LLCs do not have shareholders or issue shares, but they have members who make contributions in return for their interest as members. Legally membership interests in an LLC are a form of hybrid between traditional share capital and partnership interests in the capital of a partnership.

Shareholders in an Anguillan company do not enjoy statutory pre-emption rights or rights of first refusal in relation to new issuances or sales of shares. Companies may provide for bespoke provisions relating to such rights in their constitutional documents, and this will sometimes occur in joint ventures or where preferred shareholders invest in the company.

Shareholder voting in Anguillan companies is predicated by the normal basis of majority-control.

Shares in an International Business Company may only be issued as fully paid. The International Business Companies Act is unclear as to what the effect of a purported share issue is where the share is not fully paid, but it seems probable that the result is it would be void. Shares in an International Business Company are person property, and the situs of the shares is in Anguilla, and shares may be mortgaged or charged by the shareholder. Dividends on shares may only be paid out of surplus, which for the purposes of Anguillan law is defined as the excess, if any, of the total assets of the company over the sum of its total liabilities as shown in the books of account, plus its capital.

International Business Companies may acquire and hold their own shares as treasury shares, but whilst they hold them the shares are disabled in terms of voting powers and rights to receive dividends.

International Business Companies may issue bearer shares, but they may only be held by a licensed custodian, who must maintain records of the beneficial owner of the share. There are no equivalent restrictions on the power of companies to issue bearer debt securities or bearer share warrants.

== Debt finance ==
In addition to raising capital from their members by way of equity, Anguillan companies may raise capital by way of debt, either in the form of loans or by issuing debt securities. Companies are not required to file financing statements in Anguilla when borrowing money.

Where a creditor takes security from an IBC for the indebtedness of the company, the company may elect to opt into the public security registration regime. In practice, a secured creditor will often insist that it does so, and loan documents often contain a covenant to this effect. Once the IBC has elected to become a security registering company, then either the company or any secured creditor may register any security interest created by the company in the register of registered charges. Order of entry of security interests in the public register determine priority as between competing security interests, but there is no general right of public inspection of the register or registered charges. Registration of a security interest either requires an original document or a "wet-ink" certified true copy. In addition, each IBC must keep a private register of charges, but this is a matter of internal record keeping and does not affect the priority of security interests or third party creditors' rights generally.

There is no public registration system for security in relation to a CAC. All CACs are required to enter particulars of mortgages and charges in a private register of charges, but this is not a document which the public have access to, and registration (or failure to register) does not affect third party rights.

There are no equivalent security registration provisions at all for LLCs.

There are no restrictions prohibiting Anguillan companies of any type from giving financial assistance for the acquisition of their own shares or membership interests, and no requirement to go through a "whitewash" procedure.

== Reorganisation and restructuring ==
There are a number of statutory provisions whereby companies registered in Anguilla may reorganise themselves, either pursuant to a general group reorganisation, or as part of a debt restructuring, or in order to complete an M&A transaction.

- Mergers and consolidation. Two or more IBCs or LLCs may either merge or consolidate by statute into a single successor company, and the successor company will succeed to the assets of all of the constituent companies and be subject to all of the liabilities and obligations of the constituent companies. In a merger, the successor company is one of the original companies which merged. In a consolidation all of the constituent companies are merged into one new company which did not exist prior to the consolidation. After the merger or consolidation is completed the non-surviving companies are struck-off and cease to exist. There is no equivalent for a CAC.
- Continuation. Although not so much a reorganisational process in its own right, IBCs and LLCs registered in Anguilla are able to redomicile to (or, in the words of the statute, "continue their existence under the laws of") any other jurisdiction which permits companies to change their jurisdiction of registration. Similarly, companies are entitled to migrate to the Cayman Islands from other jurisdictions where those other jurisdictions permit this. There is no equivalent for a CAC, but a CAC may "continue" its existence as an IBC, and thereafter continue to another jurisdiction.
- Arrangements. IBCs may enter into a scheme of arrangement whereby the court sanctions a compromise or arrangement which is entered into by the members or creditors of a company. The scheme must be approved by a majority in number and 75% in value. Where the scheme members or scheme creditors have different interests, the court may be order that they be divided into two or more classes for the purposes of voting on the scheme. Although similar statutory provisions are normally referred to as schemes of arrangement in other jurisdictions, in the provisions in the Anguillan legislation they are referred to as an "arrangement". There is no equivalent for a CAC or LLC.

By contrast, there are no real statutory reorganisational processes at present which apply to CACs.

== Insolvency ==
Anguillan corporate insolvency law is presently highly fragmented, with various different parts of appearing in either the Bankruptcy Act (Cap B.15) or the Companies Act (Cap C.65). However, the matrix of laws is nonetheless fragmentary and incomplete. At present there are no provisions under Anguillan law in relation to corporate insolvency which address insolvency set-off, or the avoidance of dispositions after the commencement of winding-up. There are also no powers conferred upon the liquidator specifically relating to challenging transactions entered into the "twilight" period which prejudice the general body of creditors, but there is limited scope to seek redress for such transactions outside of the insolvency regime under the Fraudulent Dispositions Act (Cap F.60).

However, the legislature is currently considering a comprehensive new Insolvency Act which will both close all of the relevant gaps in the law, and consolidate all related laws relating to both corporate insolvency and personal bankruptcy into a single statute.

Where a liquidator over a company is appointed (either voluntarily or by the court), the liquidator's primary duty is to collect in all of the company's assets and then distribute them pari passu to the company's creditors. The law confers wide powers upon the liquidator to enable him to do so. Once a liquidator is appointed, unsecured creditors cannot commence legal proceedings against the insolvent company without the leave of the court, and any rights of action against the company are converted into claims in the liquidation process. Any disposition of property by the company after the commencement of winding-up is void unless the court otherwise orders.

Secured creditors generally do not participate in the liquidation process, and may continue to proceed with any enforcement action directly against their collateral pursuant to a valid security interest.

Anguillan law provides for statutory netting relating to financial contracts under the Netting Act (Cap N.03), and this will prevail over any other off provisions arising by law.

== Financial services regulation ==
Financial services are regulated in the Cayman Islands by the Anguilla Financial Services Commission (or FSC), an independent regulator. The FSC's ambit extends to companies (and any other entities) which are engaged in regulated business. The principal types of business which are regulated are:

1. Investment funds
2. Insurance
3. Banking
4. Trust companies

Most regulated business in Anguilla is regulated if it is conducted "in or from within" the jurisdiction. Accordingly, if an Anguillan company is incorporated to provide investment advice in Switzerland, it would still be regulated in Anguilla because it is providing regulated services "from within" the jurisdiction.

== See also ==
- List of company registers
