= Geology of Anguilla =

The geology of Anguilla consists of Lesser Antilles island arc volcanic rocks overlain by Oligocene, Miocene and Pliocene reef limestone. Older tuff and basalt outcrops in only two places on the island, which are tilted. During the Pliocene and Pleistocene, the underlying Anguilla Bank likely connected Saint Bartholomew and Saint Martin as one island.
