= Sailing in Anguilla =

Sailing in Anguilla has a long and deep history, and is one of the defining characteristics of the island. The history of Anguillian sailing is often indistinguishable from the history of the island itself. Sailing craft date back to the Taino and Arawak peoples who inhabited Anguilla before the British Colonisation. However these craft have had little influence on the unique sailing practiced in Anguilla. Instead, it originated from the fishing vessels constructed and built locally after colonization and the subsequent collapse of the local plantation system to provide food and modest income to the inhabitants.

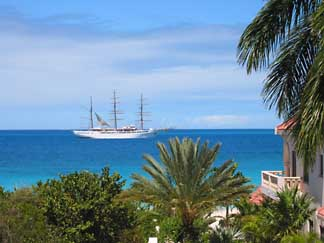
A modern square rigger viewed from Long Bay

== "The Battle of Anguilla" ==
The earliest reference to sailing in Anguillian history involves what is unofficially known as "The Battle of Anguilla". In 1796, during the height of the Napoleonic Wars, 400 men were dispatched from the neighboring French colony of St. Martin aboard two frigates, Le Decius and Le Valiant. This force landed on what is now known as Rendezvous Bay. An Anguillian defense force was led by Lieutenant Governor Benjamin Gumbs, and for the next four days they were beaten back through the capital of The Valley and onto Sandy Hill, where they fortified themselves in a former Dutch Fort. Desperate for ammunition, they were said to have used lead weights from fishing nets and musket shot, and an Anguillian sailing ship was sent to St. Kitts to request aid. This ship, whose name was not recorded, came into contact with the H.M.S. Lapwing led by Commander Barton. Barton acted swiftly to relieve Anguilla, and the Lapwing's presence drove the French to attempt to retreat. Le Decius and Le Valiant fled and attempted to escape the British frigate, leaving the soldiers stranded. They surrendered to the Anguillian forces, were imprisoned and then massacred in retaliation for the massive amount of damage inflicted by the invaders. The Lapwing sank Le Decius and drove the Le Valiant onto the rocks in St. Martin, where it was set ablaze.

=== Effects ===
The Battle of Anguilla had several interesting cultural effects on the island. Rendezvous was named because it was the site where the French held their "rendezvous" for the invasion. Lead sinker balls are referred to locally as "bullets" after the desperate attempts of the besieged militia. However, the main effect was a result of the devastation inflicted on the plantations, in addition to the island's naturally arid climate and hurricanes doomed large scale agricultural efforts. By 1821, plantations were almost totally eliminated. Despite this, Anguillian subsistence farmers managed to grow corn, pigeon peas and other staples. The surplus of especially good yields was shipped overseas. However, as a result of the failure to maintain effectively the only profitable economy it could as a British colony it fell into poverty. Twice, in 1832 and 1843, the Governor of the Leeward Islands recommended a complete evacuation of the island and resettlement of the residents to Guyana and Trinidad. With no other alternative, the Anguillian people turned to maritime occupations - fishermen, shipwrights, riggers and traders.

It is considered ironic that the name of the Anguillian ship which was sent for rescue, almost undoubtedly the forerunner of the modern Anguillian racing boat was lost, while the name of the Lapwing survives as a favored name for boats even today, especially among the police force boats.

== Trade with Nova Scotia ==
After the American Revolution the Navigation Acts banned trade between the new United States of America and the British West Indian colonies. Canadian territories, especially schooners from Nova Scotia filled this gap in trade. These ships exported Canadian timber and fish and were then reloaded with West Indian sugar, rum, molasses and salt.

=== Salt Industry ===
The salt industry began in 1769 providing Anguilla with an export. This industry was based in the village known as "Sandy Ground", which is situated on a stretch of sand between the large Road Salt Pond and Road Bay. Anguilla has roughly 270 acres (1,100,000 m^{2}) of salt ponds, less than half of that of the Turks and Caicos. Although it lacked plantations and had smaller salt ponds, the salt industry benefited from close proximity to Demerrara, Trinidad, Barbados, Antigua and St. Kitts. Schooners returning to Canada from these colonies would make a last stop in Anguilla or St. Martin to purchase salt. These ships would jettison their ballast in Road Bay as the salt was loaded on board. The granite rocks used as ballast accumulated at the northern end of Road Bay and formed a reef known locally as "The Ballast".

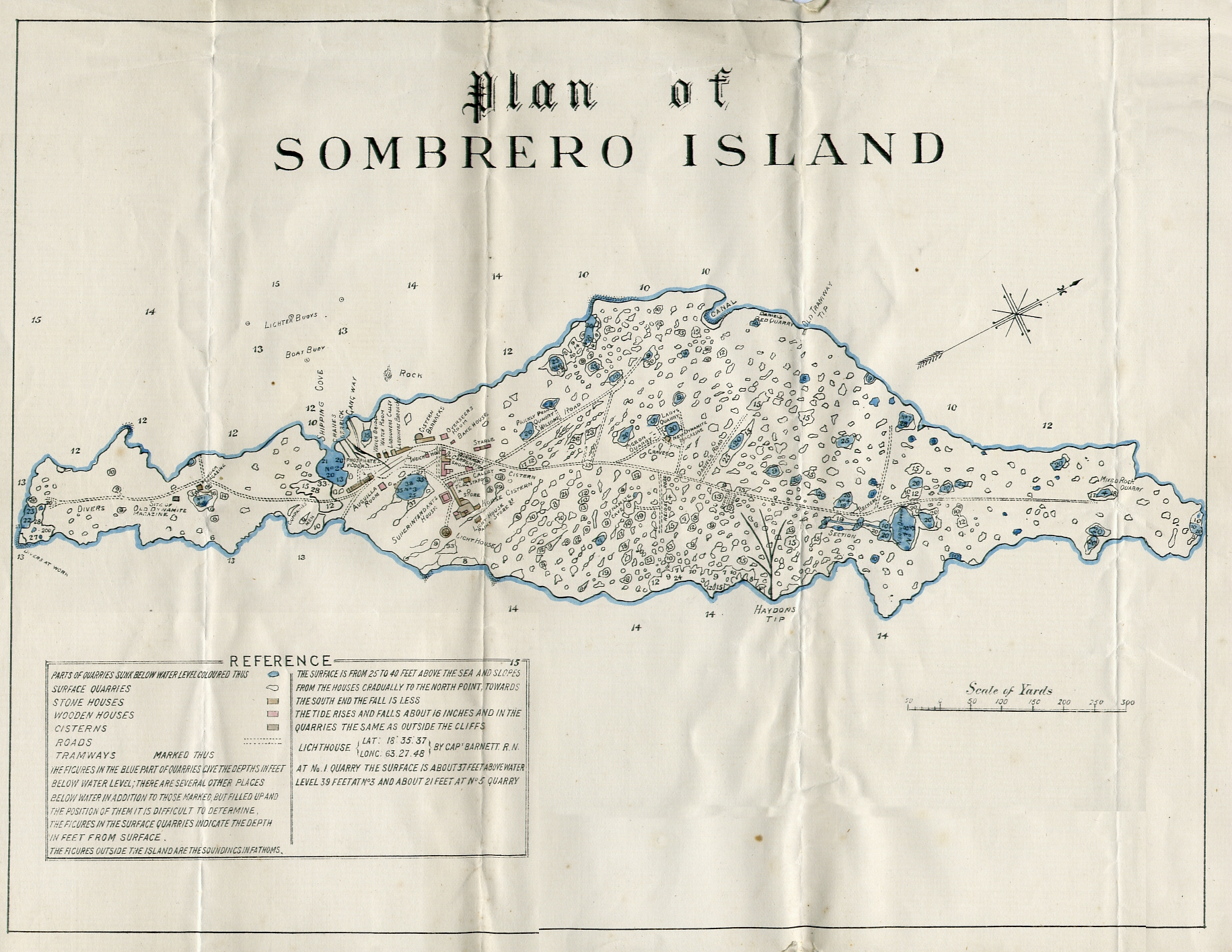
An 1880 map of Sombrero, showing the mining operations

=== Phosphate Mining ===
The short lived phosphate mining industry was a major source of income for Anguilla in the 19th century. Although there was some mining on the mainland of Anguilla, the majority of the phosphates were mined from quarries on Sombrero. Beginning in 1860, American entrepreneurs invested in several pieces of equipment and construction on the island, including a steam railway, accommodation for workers from Anguilla, a rock crusher and several loading points for ships. The operations on Sombrero declined drastically in 1880, and the supply had been exhausted by 1890.

=== Effect of industries ===
The presence of the schooners and the income from the trading allowed Anguillian sailing to advance. Shipwrighting and rigging were honed considerably during this period. Foreign exchange earnings allowed the purchase of metal pieces for use on ships, such as hawse-pipes and deck pumps. Anguillians who sailed with Canadian and other crews were able to learn and teach new knowledge and traditions to Anguillian sailing peers, improving sailing knowledge in Anguilla. In addition, due to a Canadian policy of replacing Grand Bank fishing schooners after 10 years. Many of these were purchased by Anguillians. By the end of the 19th century, an impressive number of the roughly 4,000 residents of Anguilla owned a trading sloop or schooner. These Anguillians earned a living with their vessels by running a trading fleet. They mostly made shipments for merchants from more prosperous islands. Uniquely among trading boats in the Caribbean, Anguillian boats deducted running expenses from gross earnings, and then the pay was divided up as follows: The owner earned one third of the net earnings and the remaining two thirds. The captain was then paid an additional half-share of the captain's earning. This scheme, known as the "Share Plan", was typically used by fishermen, but only by traders in this case.

== Migration to Santo Domingo ==
In 1895, major American investment spurred the growth of the sugar industry in the Dominican Republic. Large plantations recruited cane cutters from Eastern Caribbean islands - Particularly, St. Martin, Tortola, Anguilla, St. Kitts and Antigua. Although the pay was merely $0.17 per ton of cane and conditions were poor, the opportunity was considered a "saviour" by those who took it up, especially among the still poverty stricken Anguilla.

The Anguillian trading fleet found it an even greater opportunity - Many of the labourers from islands in the southern end of the archipelago came to St. Martin to find transportation to Santo Domingo. In addition, the exchange also opened up new trade routes between the Eastern Caribbean and Puerto Rico and the Dominican Republic. However, British law limited the number of passengers to a number equal to its weight in tons. Most schooners, weighing between sixty and ninety tons, were limited to sixty to ninety passengers. To avoid this law, the ships would load to full legal capacity in Anguilla and leave for St. Martin. Once in Marigot, under French jurisdiction, they would be allowed to take on as many passengers as they desired. Usually each schooner carried roughly two hundred men in cramped conditions on leaving Marigot.

The schooners (and occasionally sloops) would leave St. Martin on the first or second of January. The ships would leave en masse, on a downwind run to Santo Domingo and La Romana. (The wind typically blows from the east in the West Indies.) On these downwind legs, the crew of each vessel would often attempt to outrun each other to alleviate the boredom of a journey that often took four days. The return trip in July, being a beat directly to windward, was difficult and long, taking up to twenty-one days. It was also more competitive, with much debate on tactics and weight distribution on each ship. Some even breached international navigation rules and switched their starboard and port lights in attempt to fool their opponents. In addition to being a source of entertainment, the schooners that could outrun their opponents were able to deliver their loads home faster. Those with a reputation for speed were able to charge more per passenger, and were usually guaranteed a full load of passengers. Even after the schooners had been derigged and the crews turned to fishing, their passion for racing and sailing experience carried on into the smaller fishing craft.

The racing fervor was not limited to crew, however. Passengers on the boats were spectators and volunteers, usually rooting for the boat that they were traveling on. In addition, as most of the able-bodied men were employed as either mariners or cane cutters, the elderly, women and children highly anticipated the return of the schooners. On the event of the top of a mast being spotted, eager loved ones on shore would watch anxiously as two or three ships would fight for first anchorage. In this way, with essentially all Anguillians in one way or another involved in the boat race, it would have an indelible mark upon the culture of the island. Many stories are passed down of this time, often considered the "golden age" of Anguillian sailing.

On one occasion the Ismay and the Warspite were close at the end of the journey to their anchorage in Sandy Ground. These impromptu races would cause great excitement among the people in Anguilla, especially in Sandy Ground, who had their own favourite. The Ismay usually won. On one occasion, the Warspite was tacking back and forth up to the anchorage. The Ismay was on a long tack and passed close to Sandy Island and continued all the way up until she was almost under the lee of the hills. Many of her supporters, some of whom had placed bets, were worried that the hills would kill her wind. It was a beautiful sight to see the Ismay under full sail. The Warspite looked certain to win. Then the Ismay tacked and in a straight reach beat the Warspite to the mooring. The congregation in a church on South Hill slowly emptied as the worshipers slowly went out toi watch, finally followed by the Minister.(Source Daphne Gillanders née Lake -Captain Olando Lake's daughter). The schooners became legends and their captains became heroes in Anguillian history. Some of the notable ships include the Yolanda (owned by Captain Olando Lake), the Ismay (Captained by Orlando Lake and now commemorated on the Anguilla $3.00 stamp) and the Warspite (captained by Joe Romney). The Warspite, which continued sailing decades later under various captains, was later commemorated as a symbol of Anguilla and featured on the EC ten dollar bill.

In 1930 the dictator Rafael Trujillo rose to power in the Dominican Republic. The resulting instability and terror sent the schooner trade into decline, and was finished by the end of the decade. The trading fleet switched over to sailing up and down the islands for irregular cargo duties.

== Fishing ==
Fishing was the main source of food for Anguillians, though it was complemented by subsistence farming. Surplus fish were sold in St. Martin to support the purchase of foods such as flour, rice, cornmeal and salt pork, which were unavailable in Anguilla otherwise.

The boats were typically between 17 and 20 feet (6.1 m), with no deck. The mast was 25 feet (7.6 m) tall and made of soursop wood, with mainsails made of 8 ounce duck cloth and jibs of 7 ounce "duck". Three times a week they would leave their villages before dawn and set fish traps at reefs along the length of the island. Usual catches included grouper, butterfish, goatfish, grunt, snapper, oldwife and hammerheads (a blue fish which is now rarely seen). The fish were sold in "straps" (six to eight pounds of fish strung together through the gills) for between two and four pence. As refrigeration was unavailable at the time, boats were required to reach shore before midday to sell their catch quickly.

They typically sailed in convoys of three or four boats from a particular village. If one boat finished fishing before the others in its convoys, it would "lay to" (furl the jib and slacken the mainsail) and wait for the others. Once all were finished, they would race home. These impromptu competitions were the basis for modern Anguillian races.

== Smuggling ==
As a result of living off of mainly fishing and subsistence farming, Anguillians had little money to hire labor for plowing, or "holing ground" as it was locally called. Instead, a communal effort called "jollification" would provide the labor for such a task. Several neighbors and friends of the person who needed the help would gather and work together to prepare the ground. This labor would be paid for in demijohns of rum which would be available at the jollification. With little money, Anguillians could hardly the exorbitant duties on rum -- a gallon of rum purchased in St. Martin for 3 shillings in the 1930s would cost 20 shillings including tax. Instead of paying this, the majority of the fishing boats began to smuggle at night. Although the majority of the cargo was rum, staples including flour, rice and sugar were also smuggled.

Contraband would be loaded in St. Martin and then carried at night to Sandy Hill Bay and Little Harbour on the southern side of the island and occasionally to Mead's Bay (then Maid's Bay) on the northern side of the island. The sales were legal in St. Martin, and friendly suppliers would open themselves for business at night as a convenience to smugglers. Jules Petit in particular was a major supplier and owner of an infamous racing boat, the Polaris, which led the St. Martin contingent to races in Anguilla. Police efforts in Anguilla at the time were concentrated on capturing smugglers, which made them unpopular among the people - on one occasion, police escorting two captured smugglers were assaulted and the smugglers freed. (They were re-arrested the next morning.) Many stories and calypsos have been written about the exploits of the smugglers and confrontations with the police and colonial magistrate from St. Kitts.

The smuggling boats were typically small, quick and maneuverable fishing boats with an easily collapsible rigging. The ideal smuggling boat would be able to sail across the channel from St. Martin laden with cargo and arrive in Anguilla well before dawn. Upon arrival, it was necessary to collapse the sail and rigging quickly to avoid attracting attention of the authorities. This design lent itself well to racing, and as a result the smuggling boat is the direct forerunner of the Anguillian racing sloop.

Communities and families highly prized the smuggling boats, and depended on them to outwit the Revenue Officers. This passion was a precedent to the modern racing fervor.

== Regattas ==
There are regular sailing regattas on national holidays which are contested by locally built and designed boats. These regattas do not conform to international sailing rules with regard to right of way. Instead, there is only one rule, known as the "hard lee" rule. (The name derives from the motion required to tack a tiller boat, which is to push the tiller "hard to leeward"). In the event that two boats on opposite tacks are on a collision course, one or both of the captains may elect to call "hard lee" to the other. When this call is made, both boats must tack regardless of whether it is advantageous or not. The objective of this manoeuvre is to attempt to gain as much distance upwind as possible before having to tack to avoid a collision. Alternatively, one captain may decide to "draw" and either tack earlier or change his point of sail to avoid the manoeuvre. This means a loss in height, but it may be preferable to tacking towards a shallow reef or other unfavourable position.

== August Week ==
Throughout the English-speaking Caribbean the first Monday in August is a national holiday commemorating the Emancipation Act passed by the British House of Commons on July 31, 1833. The act took effect on August 1, 1834 and freed all slaves under British control.

=== Before 1840 ===
Before 1840, August Monday in Anguilla was celebrated at "Landsome Pasture" (Now Ronald Webster Park). The Anglican Vestry would organize a fair, bazaar and sports meet. A few days prior, the schooner Betsy or the sloops Speed would sail to St. Kitts for supplies including ice packed in sawdust. This fair would last from ten in the morning until sunset, and the proceeds went towards the church. Fishing villages would celebrate informally by holding "stem-to-stem" races between fishing boats. West End, Island Harbour, Sandy Ground and Blowing Point would hold their own races with little organization and no prizes. Each village had their own roster of racers and their own courses.

=== August Monday Boat races ===
The first organized regatta on August Monday can be credited to good friends Melrose MacArthur Owen and William Elliot Carty, both residents of North Hill.

"Mac" Owen was a highly respected, multi-talented man who was respected island-wide. The son of Herbert Owen (a principle Sombrero lighthouse keeper), he was employed at "The Factory" (a general store, small cotton gin and blacksmith's shop), he often experimented with plumbing, electricity and machines at a time when such objects were rare in Anguilla. Despite seldom reading, he was technically gifted and his advice was often sought for repairs varying from roofs to cars. He was also a notable local cricketer. One of the few Anguillians to not fish for a living, he viewed sailing as a sport and developed his boats as such. His vessel, the Violet, a formidable craft, was noteworthy for its odd initial launching (It was lowered 200 feet (61 m) down a steep hillside near his home) and its purpose - unlike most Anguillian sailing craft, it was designed first for racing and secondly for fishing. He was known for being reserved and thoughtful, preferring to think deeply before giving his opinion (often some days later).

Elliot Carty, on the other hand, was known for his spontaneous, aggressive and forceful nature. The son of Arthur Romney Carty, owner of the Warspite, he was heavily involved in schooner building, fishing/racing boat building, fishing, trading, rigging and most things associated with boats and the sea. He is credited with building Anguilla's largest schooner, the Liberator, in addition to several others. He took over the management of the Warspite after his father became too ill to work, and later passed it down to Sir Emile Gumbs, his nephew.

== See also ==
- Transport in Anguilla
- Sailing

Wikimedia Atlas of Anguilla
