= Education in Anguilla =

Education in Anguilla is compulsory between the ages of 5 and 17. In 1998, the gross primary enrollment rate was 100.7 percent, and the net primary enrollment rate was 98.9 percent. The government has collaborated with UNESCO to develop an Education for All plan that aims to raise educational achievement levels, improve access to quality special education services and provide human resource training for teachers and education managers.

== Library ==
There is a single library, the Edison L. Hughes Education & Library Complex of the Anguilla Public Library.

== Schools ==
Area churches operate the preschools. There are six government primary schools, one government secondary school, and two private schools.

Government primary schools:

- Alwyn Allison Primary School, West End
- Adrian T. Hazell Primary School, South Hill
- Orealia Kelly Primary School, Stoney Ground
- Valley Primary School, The Valley
- Morris Vanterpool Primary School, East End
- Vivian Vanterpool Primary School, Island Harbour

As of 2017 the government primary schools had about 1,460 students in total.

The government secondary school is Albena Lake Hodge Comprehensive School in The Valley.

Private schools:

- Central Christian School, The Valley
  - It uses the Abeka curriculum and has preschool and primary school levels.
- Omololu International School, The Valley
  - It was Anguilla's first private school, and opened in 1994 as the Teacher Gloria Omololu Institute. It adopted its current name on 1 April 2013. It uses the International Baccalaureate (IB) curriculum. The name "Omululu" means "Child of God" in the Yoruba language.

== Colleges and universities ==
The Open Campus of the University of the West Indies has a site in Anguilla. It also has campuses in Barbados, Trinidad, and Jamaica. The government of Anguilla contributes financially to the UWI.

New Anglia University is a higher education institution in Anguilla offering premedical and Doctor of Medicine (MD) programmes.

A branch of the Saint James School of Medicine was established in 2011 in Anguilla. It is a private, for-profit medical school headquartered in Park Ridge, Illinois.

== See also ==
- List of schools in Anguilla
- Saint James School of Medicine
