= Music of Anguilla =

The music of Anguilla is part of the Lesser Antillean music area. The earliest people on the island were the Kalinago and Arawakan-speaking people, who arrived from South America. English settlers from St Kitts and Irish people colonized the island later. Unlike regional neighbors, however, the plantation system of agriculture which relied on chattel slavery never took root in Anguilla, causing a distinctly independent cultural makeup. The most recent influences on Anguilla's musical life come from elsewhere in the Caribbean, especially the music of Trinidad and Tobago and Jamaica, as well as abroad, especially the music of the United States and the United Kingdom. Anguilla's Rastafarian heritage has played a role in the island's music and culture and produced influential figures like activist Ijahnya Christian and Robert Athlyi Rogers, the author of The Holy Piby.

The island has produced a number of reggae, calypso, soca and country musicians. Of these, the latter is especially characteristic, as the genre of the country is not a part of the popular music in the Caribbean. Anguilla's Island Harbour, an Irish-settled village on the east side of the island, is a major center for local country music. Soca is a recent musical influence and is often accompanied by frenzied, sexualized dancing called wukin up.

Notable musicians from Anguilla include Bankie Banx, who has released over ten albums and played with musicians such as Bob Dylan, Jimmy Cliff and Jimmy Buffett. He also opened a music bar called the Dune Preserve, built in order to save the Rendezvous Bay dune; the Dune Preserve is home to the Moonsplash Annual Music Festival. Other notable musicians include the soca group Xtreme Band, who gained regional fame following their success in the 2001 Carnival.

Music institutions in Anguilla include the Soroptimist Club and the annual Tranquility Jazz Festival, though the island's most famous music celebration is Carnival, held near the beginning of August (the first Friday after the first Monday); it includes calypso competitions, j'ouvert, street dances, boat races, costumed parades and stilt walking, and beachside barbecues. Anguillans also celebrate the anniversary of emancipation in August and British holidays such as the King's birthday. For the first time in 2005, Anguilla was home to a country music festival, which was promoted by American country star Billy Ray Cyrus. Other popular musicians from Anguilla include Evan Webster, who is the most famous recent performer to emerge from the island's country music heritage.

In 2015, the island’s musical community was selected by music mogul and producer Kedar Massenburg to record a compilation collection titled Sounds of Anguilla (Volume 1). The production marked the first album ever to feature artists from a single Caribbean island representing a multitude of genres: pop, reggae, hip-hop, soca, and R&B.Proceeds from the sale of the compilation benefit the island's musical community and support its efforts to record, tour, and present the island’s music to the world.
