= God Bless Anguilla =

Regional anthem of Anguilla

- Coat of arms of Anguilla
- Territorial anthem of Anguilla
- Adopted: 1981; 45 years ago

Audio sample
- Digital instrumental version (one verse and chorus): file; help

"God Bless Anguilla" is the national song of the British overseas territory of Anguilla. Adopted in 1981, shortly after the separation of Anguilla from Saint Christopher-Nevis-Anguilla, it is considered the official local anthem, as "God Save the King" remains the official national anthem.

== Lyrics ==
I
God bless Anguilla
Nurture and keep her
Noble and beauteous
She stands midst the sea
Oh land of the happy
A haven we'll make thee
Our lives and love
We give unto thee

Chorus:
With heart and soul
We'll build a nation
Proud, strong and free
We'll love her hold her
Dear to our hearts for eternity
𝄆 Let truth and right
our banner be
We'll march ever on 𝄇

II
Mighty we'll make her
Long may she prosper
God grant her leaders
wisdom and grace
May glory and honour
Ever attend her
Firm shall she stand
Throughout every age

Chorus

== See also ==
- List of British anthems
