= South Hill, Anguilla =

South Hill
- District
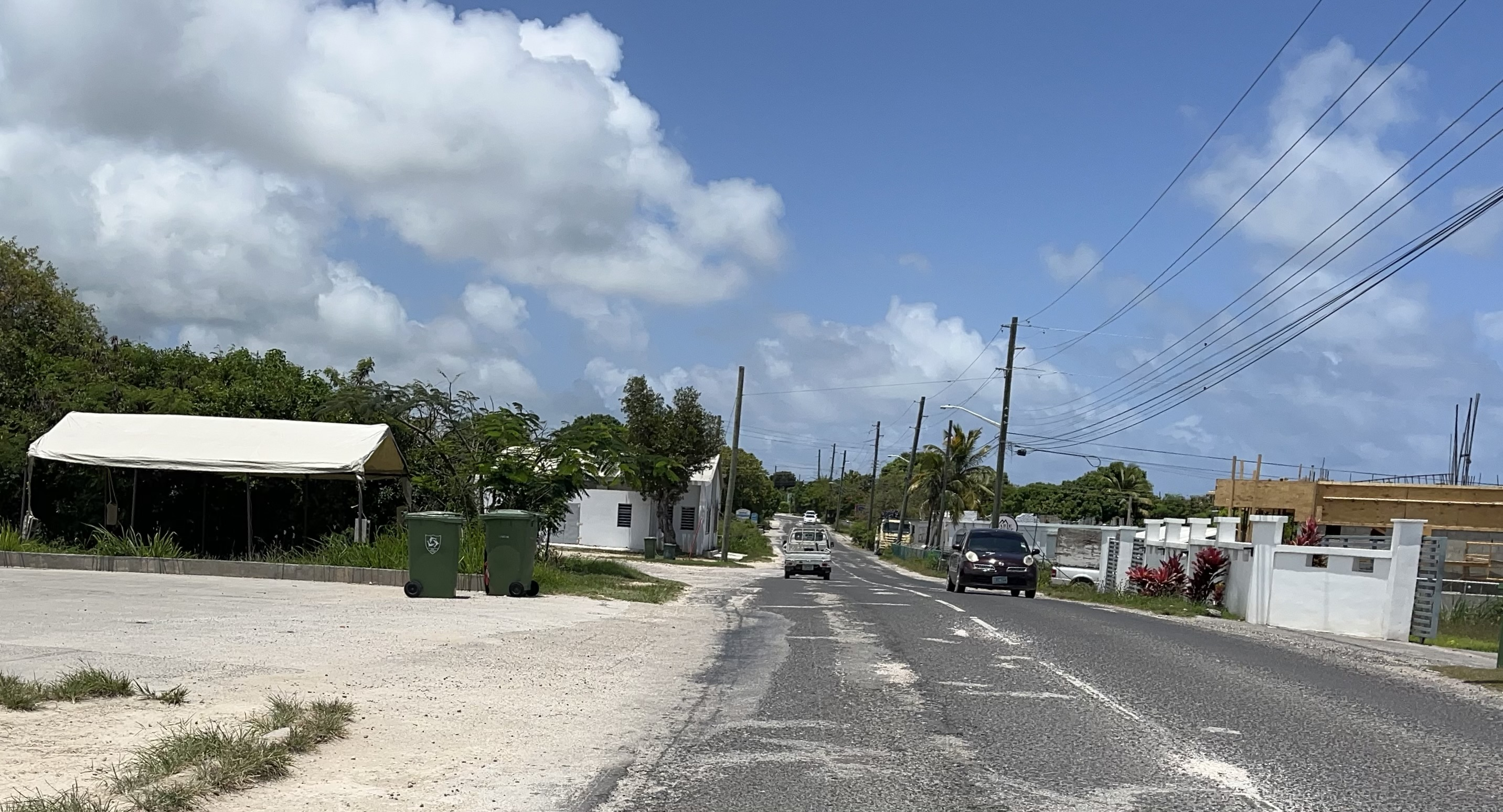

- Location within Anguilla
- Coordinates: 18.18744°N 63.09259°W
- Country: United Kingdom
- Overseas Territory: Anguilla

Area
  - Land: 2.34 sq mi (6.05 km^{2})

Population (2011)
  - Total: 1,722

South Hill is one of the fourteen Districts of Anguilla. Its population at the 2011 census was 1,722.

== Education ==
There is one government school in the town, Adrian T. Hazell Primary School. Albena Lake-Hodge Comprehensive School in The Valley serves secondary students.

== Demographics ==
Historical population

| Year | Pop. | ±% |
|---|---|---|
| 1974 | 774 | — |
| 1984 | 961 | +24.2% |
| 1994 | 1,102 | +14.7% |

| Year | Pop. | ±% |
|---|---|---|
| 2001 | 1,495 | +35.7% |
| 2011 | 1,722 | +15.2% |

Source: Statoids.com
