= Public holidays in Anguilla =

Holidays in Anguilla are predominantly religious holidays, with a number of additional national holidays. The most important holiday in the Territory is Separation day, which celebrates the separation of the island from Saint Kitts and Nevis.

Where fixed date holidays (such as Christmas Day and Boxing Day) fall on a weekend, the holiday is taken in lieu on the next succeeding working day.

Date	Name	Remarks
1 January	New Year's Day	
2 March	James Ronald Webster Day	established 2010
	Good Friday	
	Easter Monday	
1 May	Labour Day	
	Whit Monday	
30 May	Anguilla Day	
	Sovereignty Day	Monday after 2nd Saturday in June
	August Monday	First Monday in August (begin of Carnival week)
	August Thursday	Thursday after first Monday in August
	Constitution Day	Friday after first Monday in August
19 December	National Heroes' Day	
25 December	Christmas Day	
26 December	Boxing Day	

== See also ==
- List of holidays by country
