= Transport in Anguilla =

One of the British overseas territories, the Caribbean island of Anguilla measures only 16 miles (26 km) long by 3 miles (4.8 km) wide, so transport is simpler than in many countries. There is no public transport, such as bus or rail systems, since there isn't enough need. However, Anguilla's roads are better maintained than on many Caribbean islands.

Cars are the main means of transport, with driving on the left-hand side of the road, as in the United Kingdom. Although speed limits rarely exceed 30 miles (48 km) per hour and traffic moves slowly, with the island's small size it doesn't take long to get anywhere. Taxi service is unmetered, with set rates published in tourist guides. In addition to regular transport, taxis often offer island tours lasting several hours. Fares must be paid in cash.

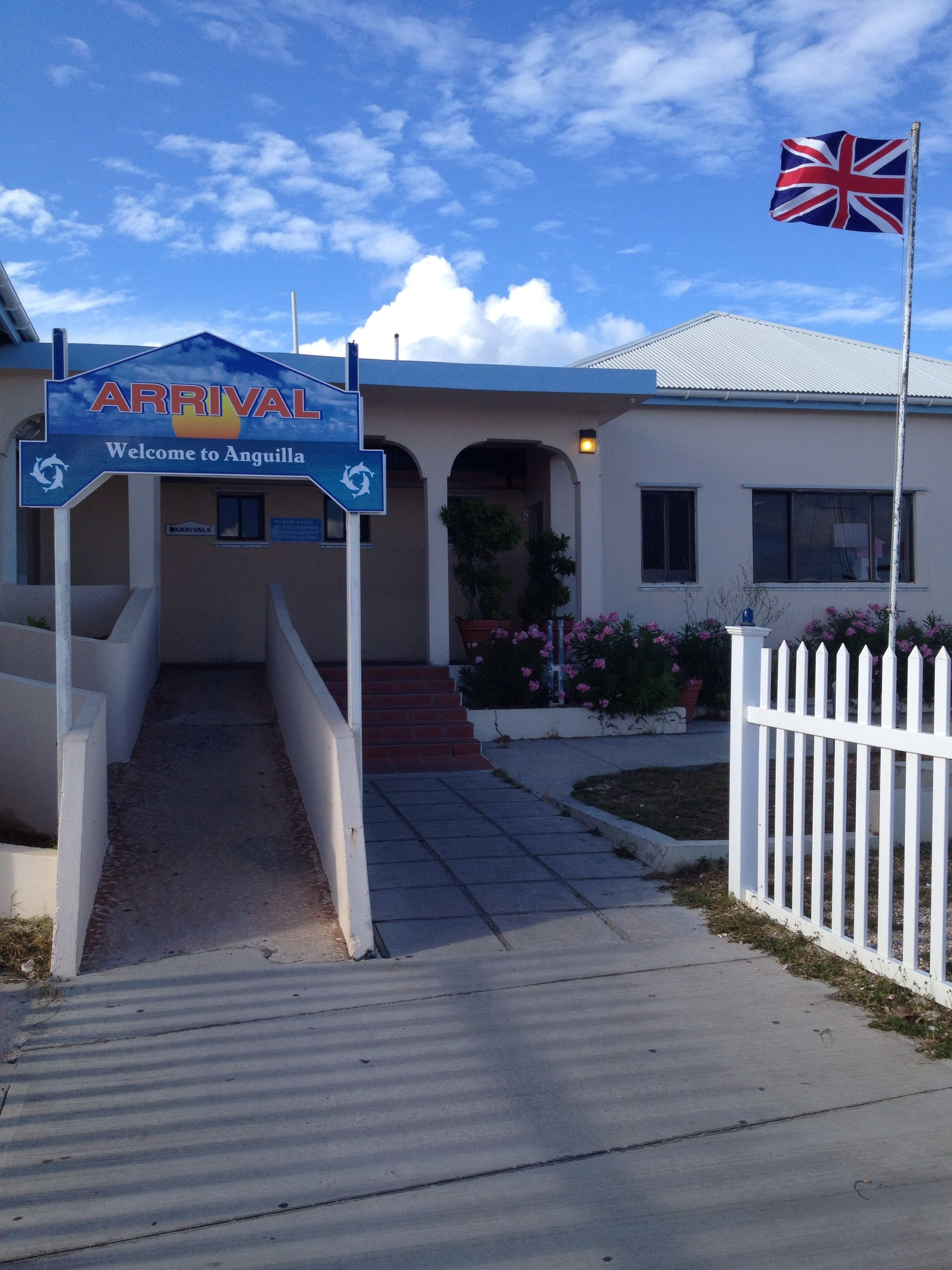
Ferry Terminal, Blowing Point

Ferries offer transport from Anguilla to other islands. The ferry from Blowing Point to Marigot, St. Martin, known to the locals as the Haddad Express, runs all day on the half-hour, into the night time. With no reservations required, taking the ferry is simple and inexpensive. Ferries can also be chartered to other destinations. One such Charter Service is from Blowing Point, Anguilla to Princess Juliana Airport to make travel easier.

Other means of transport include bicycles, mopeds, motorcycles and walking. Because of the territory's small land mass and flatter terrain, these methods make more sense on Anguilla than on many other Caribbean islands.

Cars, bikes, mopeds and motorcycles are all available for rental at reasonable prices. Both well-known car rental agencies and local companies operate rental businesses. Groups may also charter a private bus for excursions.

A railway was built to support phosphate mining on Sombrero Island.

== Statistics ==
Railways: 0 km

Highways:
total: 175 km
country comparison to the world: 209
paved: 82 km
unpaved: 93 km (2004)

Waterways: none

Ports and harbours: Blowing Point, Road Bay

Merchant marine: none (2002 est.)

Airports: 3 (2008)

country comparison to the world: 193

Airports – with paved runways:
total: 1 (2008) The runway at Anguilla Clayton J. Lloyd International Airport was completely rebuilt and extended to 5,462 feet, opening to full use in January 2005. It can accommodate virtually any business jet currently flying.

Airports – with unpaved runways:
total: 2
under 914 m: 2 (2008)

See also : Anguilla
