= Demographics of Anguilla =

This is a demography of the population of Anguilla including population density, ethnicity, education level, health of the populace, economic status, religious affiliations and other aspects of the population.

Census population and average annual growth rate
Year	Pop.	±% p.a.
1871	2,800	—
1881	3,200	+1.34%
1891	3,700	+1.46%
1901	3,900	+0.53%
1911	4,100	+0.50%
1921	4,200	+0.24%
1946	5,000	+0.70%
1960	5,810	+1.08%
1974	6,519	+0.83%
1984	6,680	+0.24%
1992	8,960	+3.74%
2001	11,561	+2.87%
2011	13,452	+1.53%

== Population ==
The estimated population of 2021 is 15,753 (the 2022 revision of the World Population Prospects).

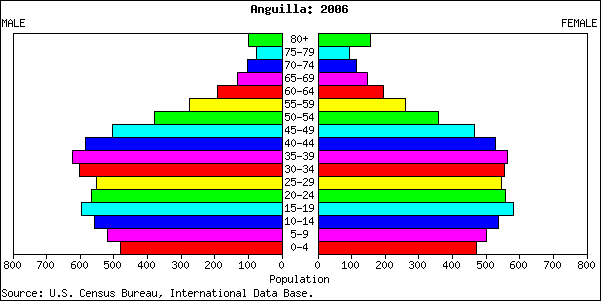
Population pyramid of Anguilla.

72% of the population is Anguillian while 28% is non-Anguillian (2001 census). Of the non-Anguillian population, many are citizens of the United States, United Kingdom, Saint Kitts and Nevis, the Dominican Republic, Jamaica and Nigeria.

2006 and 2007 saw an influx of large numbers of Chinese, Indian, and Mexican workers, brought in as labour for major tourist developments due to the local population not being large enough to support the labour requirements.

=== Structure of the population ===
Population by Sex and Age Group (Census 11.V.2011):

Age group	Male	Female	Total	%
Total	6 707	6 865	13 572	100
0–4	546	512	1 058	7.80
5–9	529	527	1 056	7.78
10–14	530	539	1 069	7.88
15–19	466	450	916	6.75
20–24	466	451	917	6.76
25–29	533	587	1 120	8.25
30–34	480	536	1 016	7.49
35–39	569	576	1 145	8.44
40–44	567	571	1 138	8.38
45–49	538	551	1 089	8.02
50–54	425	453	878	6.47
55–59	347	347	694	5.11
60–64	228	225	453	3.34
65–69	161	162	323	2.38
70–74	118	132	250	1.84
75+	204	246	450	3.32
Age group	Male	Female	Total	Percent
0–14	1 605	1 578	3 183	23.45
15–64	4 619	4 747	9 366	69.01
65+	483	540	1 023	7.54

== Vital statistics ==
	Average population (x 1000)	Live births	Deaths	Natural change	Crude birth rate (per 1000)	Crude death rate (per 1000)	Natural change (per 1000)
1988	7.6	160	67	93	21.1		
1989	8.0	189	59	130	23.7		
1990	8.3	159	54	105	19.1		
1991	8.7	172	58	114	19.8		
1992	9.0	141	67	74	15.7		
1993	9.3	171	64	107	18.5	6.4	12.1
1994	9.5	163	52	111	17.1	5.5	11.6
1995	9.8	167	55	112	17.0	5.5	11.5
1996	10.1	161	83	78	16.0	8.2	7.8
1997	10.3	169	56	113	16.4	5.4	11.0
1998	10.5	155	62	93	14.7	5.9	8.8
1999	10.8	176	58	118	16.3	5.4	10.9
2000	11.1	193	73	120	17.4	6.6	10.8
2001	11.4	183	50	133	16.1	4.4	11.7
2002	11.7	169	52	117	14.5	4.4	10.0
2003	12.0	141	65	76	11.6	5.4	6.2
2004	12.3	164	53	111	13.3	4.3	9.0
2005	12.6	167	58	109	13.2	4.6	8.6
2006	12.9	183	58	125	14.2	4.5	9.7
2007	13.1	148	70	78	11.3	5.3	5.9
2008	13.4	154	53	101	11.5	4.3	7.3
2009	13.6	181	63	118	11.3	3.7	7.6
2010	13.8	182	66	116	11.1	4.0	7.1
2011	13.572 (census)	185	59	126	13.6	4.3	9.3
2012	13.718	192	37	155	14.0	2.7	11.3
2013	13.864	165	69	96	11.9	4.9	7.0
2014	14.221	151	60	91	10.6	4.1	6.5
2015	14.862	165	61	104	11.1	4.1	7.0
2016	15.231	135	86	49	8.9	5.4	3.4
2017	15.068	145	84	61	9.6	4.6	5.0
2018	15.397	114	96	18	7.4	5.2	2.2
2019	15.602	130	85	45	8.3	5.8	2.5
2020	15.526	140	88	52	8.8	5.7	3.2
2021	15.701	157	70	87	10.0	4.5	5.5
2022	15.780	125	79	46	7.9	5.0	2.9
2023	15.931	138	95	43	8.7	6.0	2.7
2024	16.010	124	114	10	7.8	7.1	0.6
2025		116	87	29	7.1	5.3	1.8

== Ethnic groups ==
Ethnic groups of Anguilla (2011)
Ethnic groups	percent
African/black	85.3%
Hispanic	4.9%
Mixed	3.8%
White	3.2%
Other	1.6%
East Indian/Indian	1%
Unspecified	0.3%

== Languages ==
English (official).

The 2001 census found 11,329 were capable of carrying a conversation in English, and 101 were not. 82 of those spoke Spanish as a first language, 7 spoke Chinese.

The 2001 census found one heptalingual person, 13 pentalingual people, 35 quadrilingual people, 173 trilingual people, 881 bilingual people

The total numbers of speakers of each language were:

Language	Speakers
English	11,329
Spanish	738
French	342
Chinese	22
Italian	42
German	59
Dutch	95
Other	128

== Religion ==
Anguilla is predominantly Christian, with more than 85% identifying themselves with a denomination of Christianity. Migration has also resulted in various other religions to make a presence in Anguilla.

Religion	2001 Census	2011 Census
Anglicans	3,313	3,077
Methodist	2,733	2,627
Pentecostal	878	1,421
Christianity	–	1,370
Seventh-day Adventist	871	1,312
Baptist	833	961
Roman Catholic	654	920
Church of God	869	664
Jehovah Witness	81	146
Evangelical	60	107
Rastafarian	85	74
Hinduism	45	58
Islam	36	43
Presbyterian	22	25
Judaism	16	19
Brethren	39	15
None	456	610
Other	400	263
Not Stated	39	40

== See also ==
- Hinduism in the West Indies
