= Central Forest Reserve National Park =

National Park in St. Kitts and Nevis

- IUCN category II (national park)
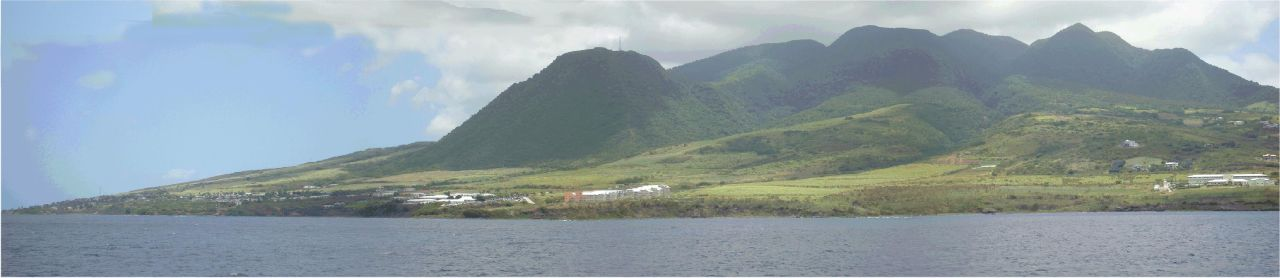

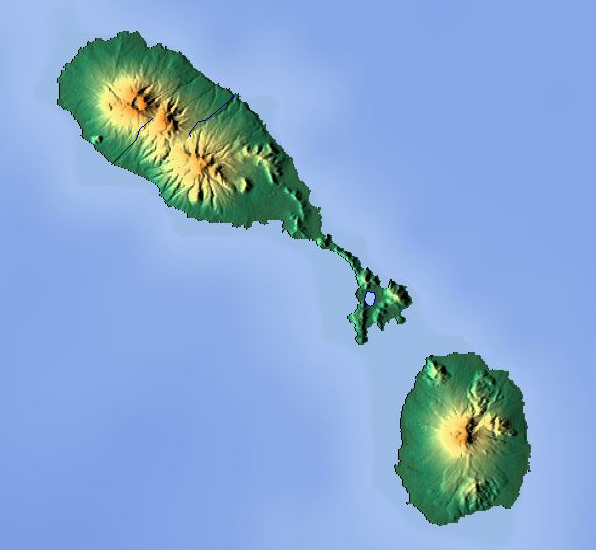
- Location within Saint Kitts and Nevis Location within the Caribbean
- Location: Saint Thomas Middle Island Parish, Saint Kitts and Nevis
- Coordinates: 17°19′59″N 62°47′22″W
- Established: 2006

Central Forest Reserve National Park is the second national park to be designated in the Saint Kitts and Nevis. It was designated a National Park by the government on 23 October 2006, and officially gazetted on 29 March 2007.

While the Central Forest Reserve is the second National Park in St. Kitts and Nevis, it is the first designated for the purposes of biodiversity conservation and sustainable development. The park contains the last remaining area of tropical forest on the island of Saint Kitts, which collects and stores rainfall for the national water supply of the island.

The park covers all the land on Saint Kitts above 300 m (1,000 ft), a total of 5,100 ha (12,500 acres) which is approximately 25% of the island. It includes Mount Liamuiga, a 1,156 m (3,793 ft) high stratovolcano, Verchild's Peak (900 m (2,953 ft)), and Olivees Mountain (886 m (2,907 ft).

Many plants such as tree ferns including Asplenium malcolm-smithii, and the Cabbage palm (Roystonea oleracea), birds such as the Lesser Antillean pewee (Contopus latirostris), bats such as the Long-tongued fruit bat or the Little big-eyed bat (Chiroderma trinitatum), and vegetation communities such as cloud forests are primarily exclusive to the high slopes of the island.

The topography of the Central Forest Reserve consists of steep narrow valleys or ghauts, rocky outcrops and cliffs, swamps, alpine marshes and bogs, landslips and other geological scars, streams, lakes, reservoirs, small upland pools, fumaroles, forests, woodlands, and grasslands.
