= Scouting and Guiding in Saint Kitts and Nevis =

Scouting and Guiding movement in Saint Kitts and Nevis

The Scout and Guide movement in Saint Kitts and Nevis is served by two organisations

- The Girl Guides Association of Saint Christopher and Nevis, member of the World Association of Girl Guides and Girl Scouts
- The Scout Association of Saint Kitts and Nevis
