= Association of American Veterinary Medical Colleges =

Veterinary medicine education

The Association of American Veterinary Medical Colleges (AAVMC) represents colleges and schools of veterinary medicine in the United States, Canada, and other countries. Its activities include involvement in veterinary medical education, oversees the accreditation process for veterinary medical schools and colleges in collaboration with the American Veterinary Medical Association, and manages the Veterinary Medical College Application Service.

== History and mission ==
The AAVMC was founded as an independent, non-profit corporation in Illinois in 1966 and celebrated its 50th anniversary in 2016. Deans of the 18 United States veterinary colleges and the three Canadian veterinary colleges at the time were made representatives of the organization to represent founding institutions. In 1972, three Councils were formed to create the AAVMC Assembly, which included the Council of Deans, Council of Chairs, which included university department chairs, and the Council of Educators, which included individual faculty members. The AAVMC also began holding the Iverson Bell Symposium in 1972 to promote diversity in the field of veterinary medicine. W. Max Decker became the first formal AAVMC employee in 1977 when he became a part-time director and treasurer of the organization. The organization began to receive corporate support in 1965, when Merck Chemical Division made a donation of $10,000. The three-Council structure of AAVMC was eliminated in 1984, and the organization was restructured to include a board of directors and an executive committee. Billy Hooper, former associate dean for academic affairs at Purdue University College of Veterinary Medicine, became the full-time executive director and helped create a permanent office in Washington D.C. in 1986. This allowed for a partnership to form between the Pew National Veterinary Education Program and AAVMC, which was operated by the Pew Charitable Trust from 1987–1989. AAVMC continues to partner with many national and international organizations. In 1995, the national common application service for applicants to veterinary school, the VMCAS, was launched and has been in operation since.

The mission of the AAVMC is to promote excellence in academic veterinary medicine as well as provide leadership for the field, with the intent to prepare the veterinary workforce with the appropriate knowledge and skills to meet the needs of animal health, relieve animal suffering, conserve animal resources, promote public health, and advance medical knowledge. It fulfills its mission through advocacy, supporting the work of member institutions, facilitating veterinary school enrollment, and building global partnerships in academic veterinary medicine. The current Chief Executive Officer is Andrew Maccabe, who holds a Doctor of Veterinary Medicine degree from The Ohio State University, a Master of Public Health degree from Harvard University, and a Juris Doctor degree from the University of Arizona. He was a former public health officer for the U.S. Air Force and served as a public health liaison for the Centers for Disease Control and Prevention (CDC) prior to his role at the AAVMC. The AAVMC Board of Directors is an elected body consisting of a president, president-elect, past-president, secretary, treasurer, four at-large regional directors, and two at-large directors representing specific areas of veterinary medicine. The non-voting members of the Board of Directors include liaisons that represent the American Association of Veterinary Clinicians, the Association of Public and Land Grant Universities, and the Student American Veterinary Medical Association, along with the Chief Executive Officer.

== Advocacy priorities ==
The AAVMC has multiple key advocacy priorities. They work to ensure support for the Veterinary Services Grant Program. This program, funded by the United States Department of Agriculture (USDA) via the Farm Bill, provides financial support for the expansion of rural veterinary practices, mobile veterinary practices, and to recruit additional veterinarians and students to these practices. The AAVMC also supports increasing appropriations allotments for the Veterinary Medicine Loan Repayment Program, which provides $25,000 in loan repayment per year, for a period of three years, for veterinarians who agree to practice medicine in areas that have veterinary medical shortages, as determined by the USDA. In addition, the AAVMC supports increased funding for research programs that target antimicrobial resistance. The AAVMC also supports the Global Health Security Agenda as outlined by the CDC and other national and international health organizations. To advocate for these issues in Washington D.C., the AAVMC regularly writes letters in support of policy initiatives in higher education, animal health, biomedical research, and agriculture. The AAVMC also conducts legislative briefings, has an active Advocacy Committee, works with the Veterinary Medicine Caucus in the United States House of Representatives, participates in the National Coalition for Food and Agricultural Research, and organizes visits to Capitol Hill for member institution representatives. To promote AAVMC advocacy initiatives, the organization launched a Public Policy Faculty Fellows Program, which brings faculty of member institutions to Washington D.C. to develop advocacy skills, learn about the federal legislative process, and explore veterinary public policy.

== Member institutions ==
Colleges and schools of veterinary medicine that are accredited or have gained reasonable assurance from the COE that are within the United States include Auburn University, Colorado State University, Cornell University, Iowa State University, Kansas State University, Lincoln Memorial University, Long Island University, Louisiana State University, Michigan State University, Midwestern University, Mississippi State University, North Carolina State University, The Ohio State University, Oklahoma State University, Oregon State University, Purdue University, Texas A & M University, Tufts University, Tuskegee University, University of Arizona, University of California, Davis, University of Florida, University of Georgia, University of Illinois at Urbana-Champaign, University of Minnesota, University of Missouri, University of Pennsylvania, University of Tennessee, University of Wisconsin-Madison, Virginia-Maryland College of Veterinary Medicine, Washington State University, and Western University of Health Sciences.

Two Caribbean islands have accredited veterinary schools including Ross University (Saint Kitts and Nevis) and St. George's University (Grenada).

In Canada, the institutions which have gained accreditation or reasonable assurance from the COE are Atlantic Veterinary College at the University of Prince Edward Island, Université de Montréal, University of Calgary, University of Guelph, and Western College of Veterinary Medicine at the University of Saskatchewan.

Other AAVMC member institutions include Massey University (New Zealand), Murdoch University (Australia), Royal Veterinary College at the University of London (United Kingdom), Seoul National University (South Korea), Universidad Nacional Autonoma de Mexico (Mexico), the Universiteit Utrecht (Netherlands), University of Bristol (United Kingdom), University College Dublin (Ireland), University of Edinburgh (United Kingdom), University of Glasgow (United Kingdom), University of Melbourne (Australia), University of Queensland (Australia), University of Sydney (Australia), and VetAgro Sup (France).

== Veterinary Medical College Application Service (VMCAS) ==
The AAVMC administers the VMCAS, which is a centralized application system that prospective veterinary students use to submit their application materials. All required application materials are processed, verified, and then sent to the veterinary medical schools that the applicant designates, such that applicants only fill out one main application. Application fees are calculated based on the number of schools that the applicant wants to send their application.

== Competency Based Veterinary Education (CBVE) ==
The AAVMC has spear-headed a working group to develop a competency-based learning framework for veterinary medical education, which would standardize learning milestones and establish core activities that would be required for veterinary students across institutions. The domains of competence include clinical reasoning and decision-making, individual animal care and management, animal population care and management, public health, communication, collaboration, professionalism and professional identity, financial and practice management, and scholarship, and the CBVE framework is accessible online.

== Accreditation of colleges and schools of veterinary medicine ==
Colleges and schools of veterinary medicine in the United States, Canada, and across the globe that wish to become a member institution of the AAVMC must be accredited by the American Veterinary Medical Association Council on Education (COE). The COE is recognized by the United States Department of Education and is re-certified as the accrediting body for colleges and schools of veterinary medicine every seven years. Accredited institutions must also renew their accreditation every seven years. The AAVMC appoints 20 members of the COE and funds eight of these members. The AVMA also appoints and funds eight members. The remaining members represent Canada and are appointed by the Canadian Veterinary Medical Association. All appointed members serve six year terms and are full-time, permanent faculty members at either the associate professor or professor level at an AAVMC-member institution or affiliate member, and COE members represent preventative medicine, basic science, large animal clinical science, small animal clinical science, postgraduate education, veterinary medical research, and AAVMC membership. The COE publishes a Policies and Procedures manual, which outlines the current standards for accreditation. These standards include organization, finances, physical facilities and equipment, clinical resources, library and information resources, students, admission, faculty, curriculum, research programs, and outcomes assessment. There are five classes of accreditation: reasonable assurance, provisional accreditation, accredited, accredited with minor deficiencies, and probationary accreditation. Accreditation processes include an on-site visit by the COE and a self-study.

== AAVMC publications ==
The Journal of Veterinary Medical Education (JVME) is a peer-reviewed, internationally distributed journal published by AAVMC. The journal publishes on topics relating to veterinary educational methods, recruiting veterinary students, clinical instruction, higher education policy, and other topics related to veterinary education. The AAVMC also publishes a monthly newsletter called the Vet-Med Educator which highlights current news and events, as well as an annual report about AAVMC activities and accomplishments.

The Veterinary Medical School Admissions Requirements Guide (VMSAR) is published yearly with up to date information regarding the admissions process and requirements for AAVMC member institutions to help guide veterinary school applicants. The book summarizes deadlines, prerequisite coursework, tuition and fee costs, and campus life for each institution, provides an overview of the VMCAS, and highlights testimonials from current students and veterinarians to showcase what it is like to be a veterinarian.

== See also ==
- Veterinary medicine
- Veterinary medicine in the United States
- Veterinary medicine in the United Kingdom
- Veterinary Medical College Application Service
- American Veterinary Medical Association
- Journal of Veterinary Medical Education
