= University of Medicine and Health Sciences =

Private medical school in Saint Kitts

University of Medicine and Health Sciences, St. Kitts
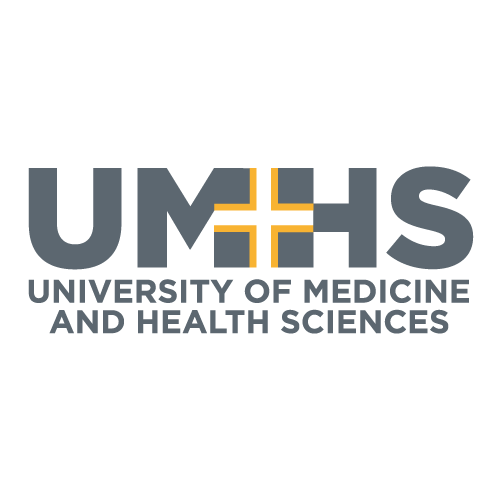
- Type: Medical school
- Established: 2007
- President: Warren Ross, J.D.
- Dean: Shivayogi Bhusnurmath, M.B.B.S., MD
- Location: Basseterre, Saint Kitts; Portland, Maine; New York, New York; 17.2945°N 62.7521°W
- Website: umhs-sk.org

The University of Medicine and Health Sciences (also known as UMHS) is a private, for-profit medical school located in Basseterre, Saint Kitts, in the Caribbean. UMHS confers upon its graduates the Doctor of Medicine (MD) degree. The university also has a 5th semester campus in Portland, Maine and an administrative office in New York, New York. The University of Medical and Health Sciences has acquired the Ross family-owned previously affiliated International University of Nursing.

== History ==
UMHS was founded in 2007 by Dr. Robert Ross, the founder and former owner of Ross University School of Medicine. The university had its inaugural class in May 2008, and held its first graduation in June 2012 at the United Nations building in New York City. UMHS is owned and operated by the Ross family, with Dr. Ross's son Warren acting as President.

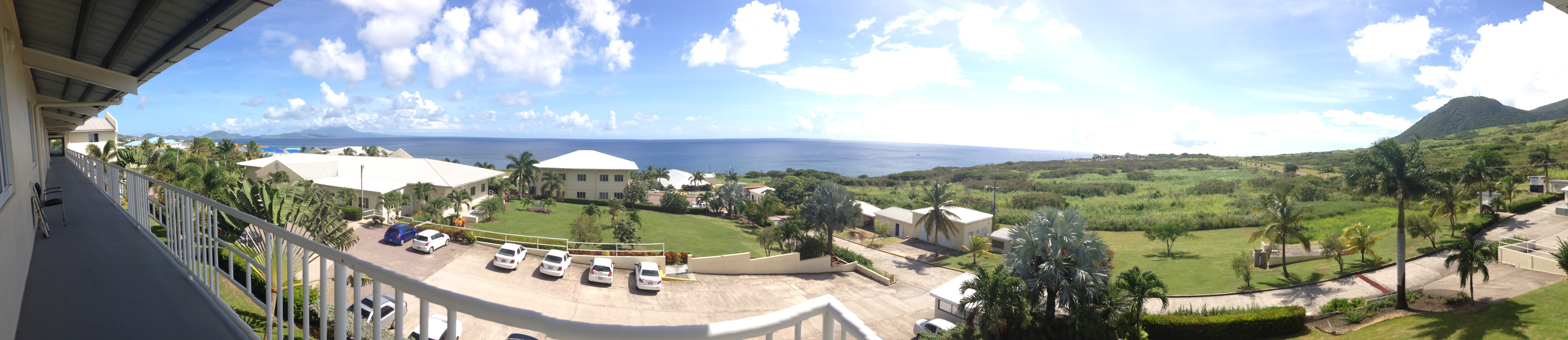
St. Kitts campus — Administration Building overlooking the Library and Caribbean Sea

== Curriculum ==
The MD program at UMHS is a 10-semester course of study that consists of three semesters per calendar year. Semesters 1–4 are basic sciences semesters that are completed at the university's Saint Kitts campus. Semester 5 (Introduction to Clinical Medicine) is completed at the university's campus in Portland, Maine. Semesters 6–10 consist of 78 weeks of clinical clerkships (48 weeks of core rotations, 30 weeks of elective rotations) that are completed at affiliated hospitals in the United States.

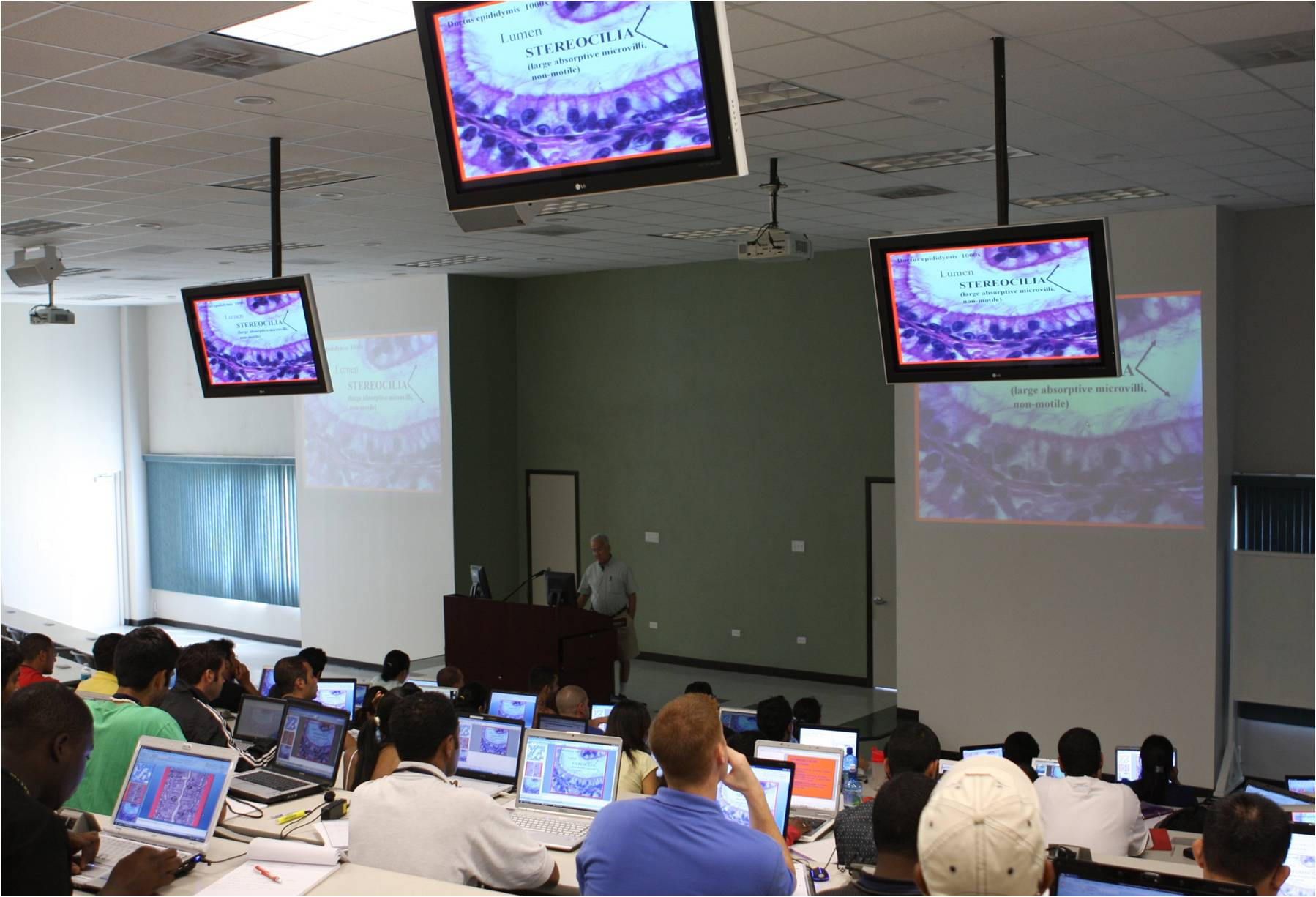
UMHS basic science campus auditorium

== Accreditation ==
UMHS is chartered in Saint Kitts and accredited by the Accreditation Board of Saint Kitts and Nevis, a recognized accrediting agency listed in the FAIMER Directory of Organizations that Recognize/Accredit Medical Schools (DORA). The school's charter was signed on August 24, 2007. UMHS is also listed in the FAIMER International Medical Education Directory (IMED).

UMHS received its six-year accreditation from the Accreditation Commission on Colleges of Medicine (ACCM) in May 2015. ACCM is an international accrediting body listed by the National Committee on Foreign Medical Education and Accreditation (NCFMEA), part of the US Department of Education, as "found to use standards to accredit their medical schools that are comparable to the standards used to accredit medical schools in the United States."

In addition to its accreditations, UMHS entered an articulation agreement with Georgia Southern University in 2015 and has obtained a provisional license by the state of Florida in 2018.

== Student life ==
Student organizations include:

- American Medical Student Association (AMSA)

== See also ==
- International medical graduate
- List of medical schools in the Caribbean
