= Deaconess Hospital (St. Louis, Missouri) =

Series of hospitals in St. Louis, Missouri

Coordinates: 38.6307°N 90.2885°W

Deaconess Hospital was the name of several hospitals in St. Louis, Missouri.

The Deaconess tradition began in 19th-century Europe when Theodor Fliedner of Kaiserswerth, Germany, established the first Deaconess Home and Hospital in 1836. The word deaconess means “one who is devoted to service”, being the feminine gender of the word deacon.

Deaconess Central Hospital was first established in St. Louis on March 18, 1889 by the Evangelical Deaconess Society of St. Louis, which was part of the Evangelical Synod that later merged with other Protestant denominations to form the United Church of Christ. It was managed by a board, not managed by the church. On August 18, 1889, the first two deaconess sisters in the United States were consecrated by the Deaconess Society. Deaconess sisters lived in a group home, were paid a small stipend and no salary, and in later years were subject to short-term or permanent transfers. They were to remain unmarried. They wore uniforms and were addressed as "Sister" followed by their forenames.

== History ==
The first hospital was located at 2119 Eugenia Street from 1889 to 1893. The second hospital, at 4117 West Belle Place, was open from 1893 to 1930. The third hospital at 6150 Oakland Avenue was a Spanish revival building; it opened in 1930. In 1985, the first Saint Louis Crisis Nursery was established when a branch of Deaconess Hospital was bought out.

=== 1997-2012 ===
The hospital, by then named Forest Park Hospital, was sold to Tenet Healthcare Corp. of Dallas in 1997. Proceeds from the 1997 sale to Tenet Healthcare Corp. were used to establish the Deaconess Foundation, which grants to children's causes in the St. Louis metropolitan area. In 2004, Forest Park Hospital was purchased by Argilla Healthcare Inc., which merged with Doctors Community Healthcare Corp. of Scottsdale, Arizona, becoming Envision Hospital Corp. It was acquired by Success Healthcare LLC in 2008. From 2007 to 2010, reduced state revenue and reduced patient demand saw 75% of its employees laid off. Its emergency room closed in 2011 following years of financial struggle and low use. In 2012, the hospital closed and its property was purchased by the nearby St. Louis Zoo as part of a 20-year expansion project. The building was demolished in 2014.

=== Nursing ===
The Deaconess school of nursing for lay students was established in 1943, becoming the College of Nursing in 1983. It was purchased by Adtalem Global Education, Inc. and became the Chamberlain College of Nursing in 2005. It has subsequently Chamberlain University.
