= Richt (surname) =

Richt is a surname of Germanic origin. Notable people with the surname include:

- Jon Richt (born March 11, 1990), American football coach
- Juergen A. Richt, veterinary virologist
- Mark Richt (born February 18, 1960), American football player and coach
