= Ross University School of Veterinary Medicine =

Medical university in St. Kitts & Nevis

Coordinates: 17°17′41″N 62°45′33″W

- Type: Private, for-profit
- Established: 1982
- Location: Basseterre, Saint Kitts and Nevis
- Website: www.veterinary.rossu.edu

Ross University School of Veterinary Medicine (RUSVM), founded in 1982, is a university offering the Doctor of Veterinary Medicine degree. As of 2014, RUSVM began offering Master of Science and PhD degrees in public health, global animal health, conservation medicine, and other research areas supported by the school. The school is located in St. Kitts. Administrative offices are located in Downers Grove, Illinois. RUSVM is accredited by the American Veterinary Medical Association Council on Education.

RUSVM students come from all over the world, with most being citizens or permanent residents of the United States, who are eligible to apply for financial assistance under Title IV of the Higher Education Act. As of 2019, RUSVM has graduated more than 5,500 veterinarians. RUSVM enrolls students three times per year: September, January and May. RUSVM is owned by Covista.

== History ==
RUSVM was founded in 1982 by entrepreneur Robert Ross, who also founded a separate institution, Ross University School of Medicine, in 1978. Ross had a friend whose son was unable to secure admission to medical schools in the United States, and founded Ross University to give him and others an opportunity to become doctors.

In 2003, RUSVM was purchased by Covista.

In 2014, RUSVM launched four research centers, to give students a research-informed learning experience and to expand RUSVM’s scientific research focus.

== Accreditation ==
In 2011, RUSVM was accredited by the American Veterinary Medical Association Council on Education (AVMA-COE)—the Department of Education's accrediting body for veterinary education—effectively validating the quality and breadth of the school’s program.

RUSVM is also accredited by the St. Christopher & Nevis Accreditation Board Ministry of Education to confer the DVM to students who successfully complete the course of the program.

The Ross University Veterinary Teaching Hospital has also received accreditation by the American Animal Hospital Association – the first teaching hospital to achieve this status outside the U.S. and Canada.

In July 2014, RUSVM received accreditation for its Postgraduate Studies program from the St. Christopher & Nevis Accreditation Board, effective for five years. The Postgraduate Studies program offers Master of Science (MSc) and Doctoral (PhD) degrees in all research areas supported by RUSVM. Areas of emphasis are guided by RUSVM's themed Research Centers.

== Academics ==
The university’s DVM curriculum follows models used in U.S. veterinary schools. It covers seven semesters in St. Kitts, followed by a year of clinical education at one of the more than 20 AVMA-accredited veterinary schools in the United States or at the AVMA-accredited Atlantic Veterinary College in Canada. The preclinical program includes a series of "introduction to clinics" courses that provide small-group instruction and hands-on animal experience through community practice, ambulatory practice, or working with university owned herds of cattle, horses, donkeys, and sheep.

== Internationalization ==
In February 2012, RUSVM partnered with Moredun Research Institute to help generate collaborative scientific research opportunities, as well as training opportunities for research scientists and veterinary students.

RUSVM has begun recruiting students in Singapore for international research internship programs. In October 2014, RUSVM signed a memorandum of understanding with Ngee Ann Polytechnic, Singapore, to “develop mutually beneficial collaborations in education and research, as well as provide a pathway for Singapore students to obtain a veterinary degree[12].

== See also ==
- International medical graduate
- List of schools of veterinary medicine
