= The Scout Association of Saint Kitts and Nevis =

Kittian branch of the United Kingdom Scout Association

- Location: P.O. Box 15, Basseterre
- Country: Saint Kitts and Nevis
- Chief Scout: Bernadette Dolphin

The Scout Association of Saint Kitts and Nevis operates as a branch of the United Kingdom Scout Association, due to Saint Kitts and Nevis' former affiliation to the United Kingdom. The Saint Kitts and Nevis Scout Oath and Law, as well as other Scouting requirements, closely follow that of the United Kingdom.

Scouting was founded on the islands in 1928 by Reverend W.A. Beckett. Although the program activities are taken from the British system, Saint Kitts and Nevis Scouting is geared to the Caribbean way of life. Training for Wood Badge and leader training are conducted with the help of British and nearby Caribbean Scout associations. Saint Kitts and Nevis Scouts participate in numerous Caribbean camps and events. Presently, five Scout groups are in operation on Saint Kitts: the Saint Georges Scout Group, Sandy Point Scout Group, Newton Ground Scout Group, Verchild's Scout Group and the newest Irishtown Primary School Scout Group.

Bernadette Dolphin was key for the development of the Scout movement on Saint Kitts. She became the first female Chief Scout Commissioner in Latin America and the Caribbean Region in the late 1990s, and still holds the office to date.

Traditionally, Founder's Day is observed with a combination of three events, a march through the streets of Basseterre, church service and luncheon.

== See also ==
- The Scout Association of Anguilla
- The Girl Guides Association of Saint Christopher and Nevis
