= Susan Groenwald =

American nurse, and educator

- Citizenship: American
- Education: Rush University; Capella University
- Awards: National Businesswoman of the Year, 1999
- Scientific career
- Fields: Nursing
- Workplaces: Adtalem Global Education Foundation; Chamberlain University; Barter Corp

Susan Groenwald is an American nurse and educator. She is best known for her work as a cancer nurse and her leadership expanding Chamberlain University.

Groenwald began her career as a member of the faculty of the College of Nursing at Rush University. From 1981 to 2003 she worked at Barter Corp where she was CEO. Started in 2006, she became President of Chamberlain University, and during her tenure she expanded from one campus in St Louis to more than twenty campuses across the country. In 2018, Groenwald retired as President of Chamberlain University, but she remains on the Board of Adtalem Global Education Foundation.

In 2017, to document her efforts at Chamberlain University, Groenwald released a comprehensive book entitled, "Designing and Creating a Culture of Care for Students and Faculty: The Chamberlain University College of Nursing Model.” The book is designed to provide organizational guidance for leaders looking to make structural and cultural changes to improve student and employee satisfaction, engagement and achievement.

Groenwald was named National Businesswoman of the Year in 1999 by the Chicago Chapter of the National Association of Women Business Owners. In 2014, she was named both a Fellow of the American Academy of Nursing and a Fellow of the Academy of Nursing Education of the National League for Nursing. In 2018, she was named to the list of Chicago's Notable Women in Education by Crain's Chicago Business.
