= Basseterre Valley =

Valley on the island of Saint Kitts

Coordinates: 17°18′N 62°44′W

The Basseterre Valley is a low-lying valley on the island of Saint Kitts, surrounded by the Canada Hills and Olivees Mountain. It contains Basseterre, the capital of Saint Kitts and Nevis. The valley has two rivers or ghauts named Westbourne Ghaut and College Ghaut.

The Basseterre Valley was occupied in 1627 by the French and populated. Now, Basseterre has suburbs such as Greenlands, Bird Rock, Taylor's Range and others. The valley has a harbour called Port Zante. It is reclaimed land from the sea. Port Zante is undergoing construction to become a state-of-the-art port facility, with duty-free shopping malls, restaurants, and maybe a hotel.
