= David L. Felten =

American neuroscientist

- Education: Massachusetts Institute of Technology; University of Pennsylvania
- Scientific career
- Workplaces: University of Medicine and Health Sciences; Oakland University; Seton Hall University; University of California Irvine; Loma Linda University; University of Rochester; Indiana University

David L. Felten is an American neuroscientist. He is associate dean of clinical sciences at the University of Medicine and Health Sciences, and was formerly associate dean of research at Oakland University and vice president for research and medical director of the Beaumont Research Institute.

He received a B.S. from the Massachusetts Institute of Technology in 1969, an M.D. from the University of Pennsylvania School of Medicine in 1973, and a Ph.D. from the Institute of Neurological Sciences at the University of Pennsylvania in 1974. He is on the advisory board of the Medingen Group.

He was co-founder and co-editor of Brain, Behavior, and Immunity.

He had a profound spiritual experience in 2013 while visiting Rome and subsequently converted to Roman Catholic Christianity.

== Awards ==
- 1983 MacArthur Fellows Program
- NIH MERIT award
- "Building Bridges of Integration Award" by the Traditional Chinese Medicine World Foundation

== Works ==
- Robert Ader; David L. Felten; Nicholas Cohen, eds. (2000). Psychoneuroimmunology, Volume 2. Academic Press. ISBN 978-0-12-044314-7.
- David L. Felten; Ralph F. Józefowicz (2003). Frank Henry Netter (ed.). Netter's atlas of human neuroscience. Icon Learning Systems. ISBN 978-1-929007-16-5.
- S. Freier, ed. (1990). "Peripheral Innervation of Lymphoid Tissue". The Neuroendocrine-immune network. CRC Press. ISBN 978-0-8493-4625-5.
