= AAVC =

AAVC may refer to:

- American Association of Veterinary Clinicians, US
- Apacheta-Aguilucho volcanic complex, Chile
- Assault Amphibious Vehicle Command, variant of the military AAV; see Assault Amphibious Vehicle#Variants
- Australian Army Veterinary Corps, military unit, Australia
