= Independence Square (Basseterre) =

Square in Basseterre, St Kitts and Nevis

Coordinates: 17.296124°N 62.722267°W

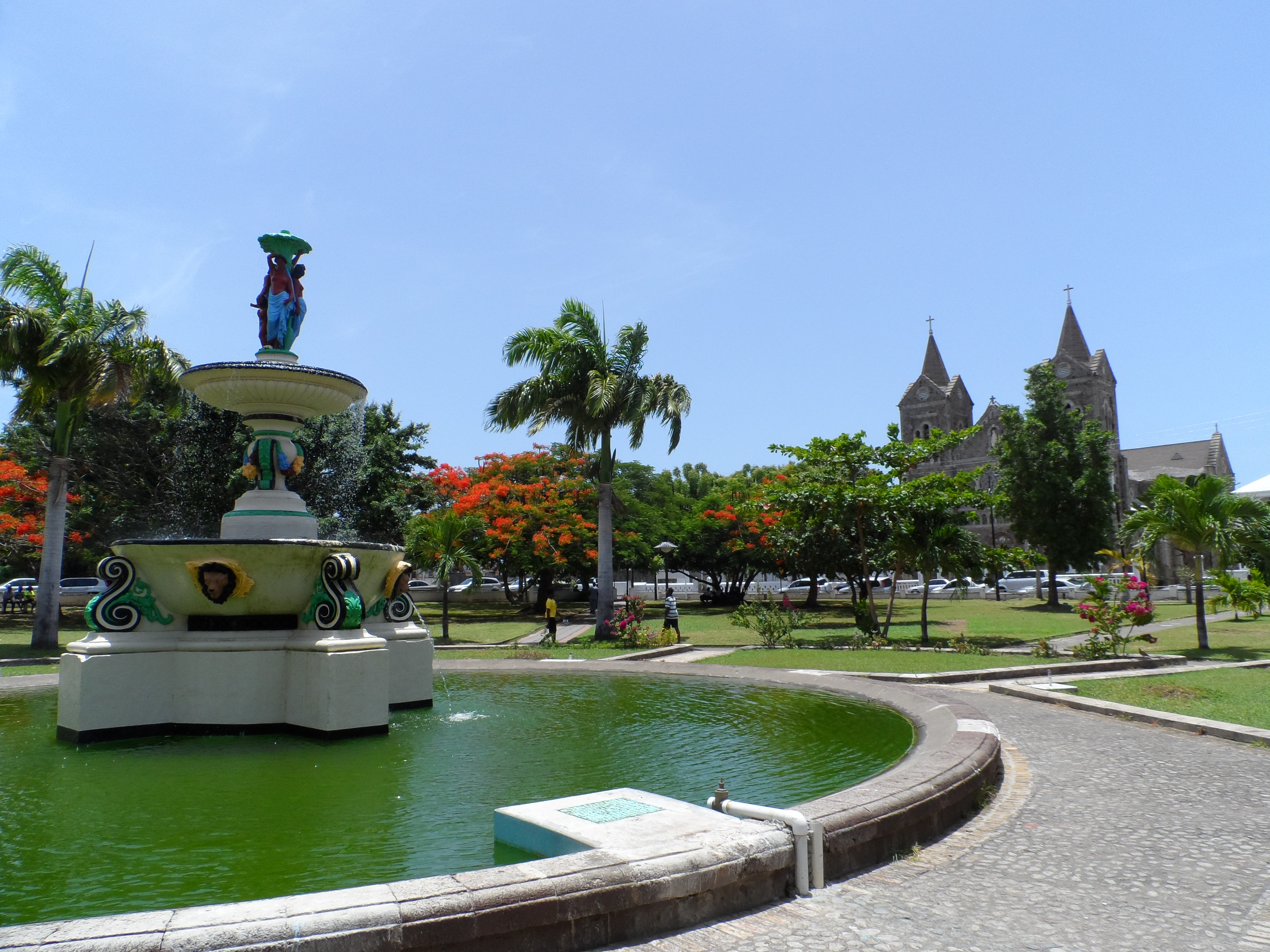
Independence Square

Independence Square is a square in Basseterre, Saint George Basseterre Parish, Saint Kitts and Nevis. It was named on the occasion of St. Kitts and Nevis achieving political independence on September 19, 1983. Originally called Pall Mall Square, The Government first acquired it in 1750 and it rapidly became the administrative, commercial and social centre of Basseterre. The Square was the site of the market where men, women and children were sold, right where the fountain is now, there was a platform for selling men, women and children. Enslaved Africans were temporarily quartered in the basement of a building on the south side of the Square. This basement is still visible to today, it has bars on the Windows and would often flood, "Besseterre" means low level. This was probably the Auction House. The Men, women and children were also sold through the business place of slave traders, many of whom operated in the Square and Liverpool Row.
