= Journal of Veterinary Medical Education =

- Discipline: Veterinary medicine
- Language: English
- Edited by: Dr. Daryl Buss

Publication details
- History: 1973–present
- Publisher: University of Toronto Press on behalf of the Association of American Veterinary Medical Colleges (Canada)
- Frequency: Quarterly

Standard abbreviations
- ISO 4: J. Vet. Med. Educ.

Indexing
- ISSN: 0748-321X (print); 1943-7218 (web)

Links
- Journal homepage

The Journal of Veterinary Medical Education is a peer-reviewed academic journal publishing research and discoveries in the field of veterinary medical education, It is the official journal of the Association of American Veterinary Medical Colleges (AAVMC), published four times a year by the University of Toronto Press.

== Abstracting and indexing ==
The journal is abstracted and indexed in:

- AGRICOLA
- Biomedical Reference Collection: Corporate
- Crossref
- EBSCO Electronic Journals Service
- JCR: Science Edition
- MEDLINE Complete with Full Text
- NA Publishing Inc.
- ProQuest
- Scholars Portal
- Scopus
- Synergies
- US National Library of Medicine
