= Saint Louis Crisis Nursery =

Safe space for children in St. Louis

The Saint Louis Crisis Nursery is an organization based in St. Louis that prevents child abuse and neglect. It provides a safe place for children whose parents are experiencing overwhelming stress or in crisis. Since its establishment in 1986, the Crisis Nursery has cared for more than 120,000 children.

== History ==
The concept for Saint Louis Crisis Nursery began in 1983 when the Junior League of Saint Louis (JLSL) instituted a research committee on child abuse and focused on three prevalent needs—networking, education, and crisis intervention services.

In 1985, the JLSL claimed a branch of Deaconess Hospital (now Forest Park Hospital) to establish the first Crisis Nursery. A United Way Research and Development Grant and a JLSL Grant were among the first sources of funds. The Coalition of 100 Black Women joined the collaborative effort in February 1986, providing educational resources to assist in structuring programs for children, training staff, participating on the Saint Louis Crisis Nursery's Board of Directors, and developing a referral system.

Saint Louis Crisis Nursery brought in its first child on July 21, 1986. In 1992, the agency opened Saint Louis Crisis Nursery North at Metropolitan Medical Center North in North St. Louis County (later relocated to Christian Hospital in 1994). Also in 1992, Crisis Nursery Saint Charles opened in a house owned by and adjacent to Saint Joseph Health Center in Saint Charles. A fourth Crisis Nursery in St. Charles opened in 1996 in partnership with the Community & Children's Resource Board of St. Charles County.

In 2006, Crisis Nursery opened two Outreach Centers: one in St. Charles County and one in St. Louis City. The fifth Crisis Nursery opened in Wentzville, Missouri, a branch funded by the CCRB, TR Hughes, and SSM-St. Joseph's Wentzville, in 2008.

In 2010, the Crisis Nursery purchased a building to house one of its nurseries and child abuse prevention programs. Using a $500,000 donation from the Centene Charitable Foundation, the Saint Louis Crisis Nursery Centene Center opened in South St. Louis City, replacing the organization's original location at Forest Park Hospital School of Nursing, which was about to close. Emerson has pledged $200,000 over the course of five years for building renovation and maintenance at the new location. The three-story facility serves 2,500 children a year, 500 more than the previous location, with separate spaces for babies and older children.

Aside from its work in preventing child abuse, Saint Louis Crisis Nursery responded to special needs in the community. During the Great Flood of 1993, the Nursery opened a temporary expansion site in Saint Charles, Missouri, to respond to families affected by the flood. This site served families who needed time to evacuate, applied for assistance, and dealt with the clean-up process. In April 2011, nursery staff helped families impacted by the Good Friday storms that struck most of St. Louis.

== Media coverage ==
- "Conversation with DiAnne Mueller, Saint Louis Crisis Nursery," Lee Presser, 2013
- "Nonprofit Spotlight: Crisis Nursery," Ladue News, August 2013
- "Making the Most of a Furlough," ABC World News with Charles Gibson, March 12, 2009
- "New Crisis Nursery Opens," Suburban Journals, June 22, 2010
- "Child Abuse: Despite High Profile Cases, The Numbers Aren't Changing Much," KTVI-TV, May 2010
- "Corporation gives $500,000 for new Crisis Nursery building," Suburban Journals, April 20, 2010
- "Emerson donates $40K for Crisis Nursery facility," St. Louis American, May 12, 2010
- "Crisis Nursery offers child safety tips for summer," Suburban Journals, June 8, 2010
- "Against the Odds, St. Louis Crisis Nursery Continues to Grow," Child Advocacy 360, March 10, 2010

== See also ==
- Child abuse
- Child advocacy
- Child advocacy 360
- Family therapy
