= Veterinary Medical College Application Service =

Veterinary school student application service

The Veterinary Medical College Application Service (VMCAS) is a centralized application service for students applying to veterinary school. Created by the Association of American Veterinary Medical Colleges (AAVMC) in 1995, VMCAS handles applications for most of the veterinary schools in the United States, as well as several in Canada, the United Kingdom, New Zealand and Australia.

== Participation in VMCAS ==
As of May 2016, only Texas A&M University does not use VMCAS at all. The list of veterinary schools using VMCAS changes over time, as does the degree to which a school may utilize VMCAS.

VMCAS is the primary source of information on the veterinary medical school applicant pool in the U.S., Canada, New Zealand, Australia, Ireland and the United Kingdom.

== The VMCAS process ==
Applicants fill out an online application, which is submitted to VMCAS. The application and accompanying materials pass through a quality inspection cycle and are forwarded to the colleges of veterinary medicine selected by the students. The centralized process considerably lightens student workloads since they may only have to submit one application rather than several. However, many of the schools using VMCAS may require applicants to submit supplemental applications in addition to the VMCAS application. Colleges also may require that some documents, like transcripts (for example) be sent to them directly.

The application cycle typically opens in May of each year.

The Veterinary Medical School Admission Requirements (VMSAR) book also contains admission requirements and contact information for all 32 U.S. and Canadian and International veterinary schools. A new edition is published every year.

== Current applications ==
VMCAS and its host organization, AAVMC, have undertaken several initiatives to increase the number of applicants to veterinary school. Applications to veterinary colleges using VMCAS remained flat over the 2002–03 to 2003–04 application cycles while other medical professions experienced 5 to 8 percent growth in applications. Colleges participating in VMCAS generally receive only two applications for every available student slot.

At least one group of scholars conclude that VMCAS should begin assessing non-technical competencies and including this assessment in the application process.
