= WikiVet =

Wiki of veterinary content based on the MediaWiki platform

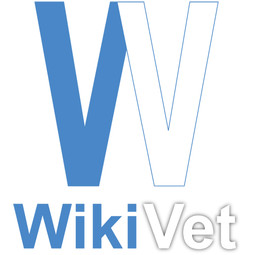

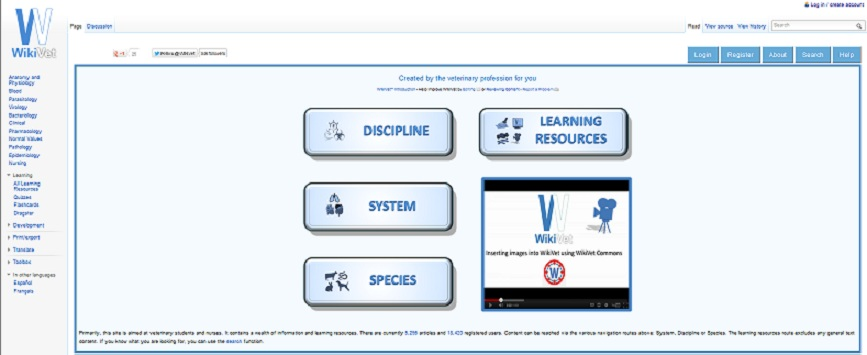
- Screenshot of home page
- Website type: Veterinary content
- Available in: English, Spanish, French
- Country of origin: United Kingdom
- Owner: WikiVet Educational Foundation
- Website: Official website
- Commercial: No
- Registration: Optional
- Users: 50,000
- Launched: April 2007
- Current status: Online

WikiVet is a wiki of veterinary content based on the MediaWiki platform. The website is a collaborative initiative between various veterinary schools, and its content covers the entire veterinary curriculum. WikiVet is part of the WikiVet Educational Foundation (UK registered charity number 1160546).

Full access to WikiVet requires a free registration, which is available to veterinarians, veterinary students and veterinary technicians. Except for content relating specifically to the veterinary curriculum, articles are authored by students or veterinarians, and subsequently peer reviewed by subject specialists.

== History ==
WikiVet was established in 2007 to provide online access to a comprehensive veterinary undergraduate curriculum. The consortium was initially formed by three UK veterinary schools, London's Royal Veterinary College, the University of Edinburgh's Royal (Dick) School of Veterinary Studies, and the University of Cambridge's Department of Veterinary Medicine, and was subsequently joined by the University of Nottingham's School of Veterinary Medicine and Science.

WikiVet was initially funded by the Higher Education Academy (HEA) and Joint Information Systems Committee (JISC). Subsequent commercial sponsors include Mars Petcare, RCVS Trust, Pfizer Global Alliances, Ceva, and the Donkey Sanctuary.

In 2010, WikiVet had 6,000 registered users. A Spanish language version was launched in May 2011. A survey of first year veterinary students in Spain, conducted when only the English-language version of WikiVet was available, found that 9% had used WikiVet. In survey of veterinarians and veterinary students in Germany, reported in 2013, 8% of respondents used WikiVet, compared to 96% who used Wikipedia. In 2016, WikiVet had 50,000 registered users from more than 130 countries.
