= Veterinary education =

Field of study

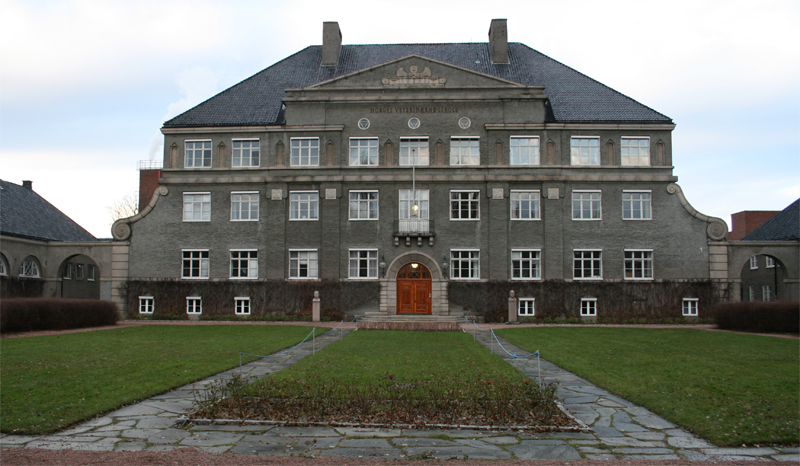
Norwegian School of Veterinary Science (Norges veterinærhøgskole), a veterinary school in Oslo

Veterinary education is the tertiary education of veterinarians. To become a veterinarian, one must first complete a degree in veterinary medicine Doctor of Veterinary Medicine (DVM, V.M.D., BVS, BVSc, BVMS, BVM etc.).

In the United States and Canada, almost all veterinary medical degrees are first entry degrees, and require several years of previous study at the university level. Many veterinary schools outside North America use the title "Faculty of Veterinary Science" instead of "College of Veterinary Medicine" or "School of Veterinary Medicine", and some veterinary schools in China, Japan and South Korea (such as the DVM degree-awarding Department of Veterinary Science and Animal Husbandry at Guangxi University in China and the Department of Veterinary Medicine at Tokyo University of Agriculture and Technology use the term "Department".) Veterinary schools are distinct from departments of animal science offering a pre-veterinary curriculum, teaching the biomedical sciences (and awarding a Bachelor of Science degree or the equivalent), and providing graduate veterinary education in disciplines such as microbiology, virology, and molecular biology.

== Degrees ==
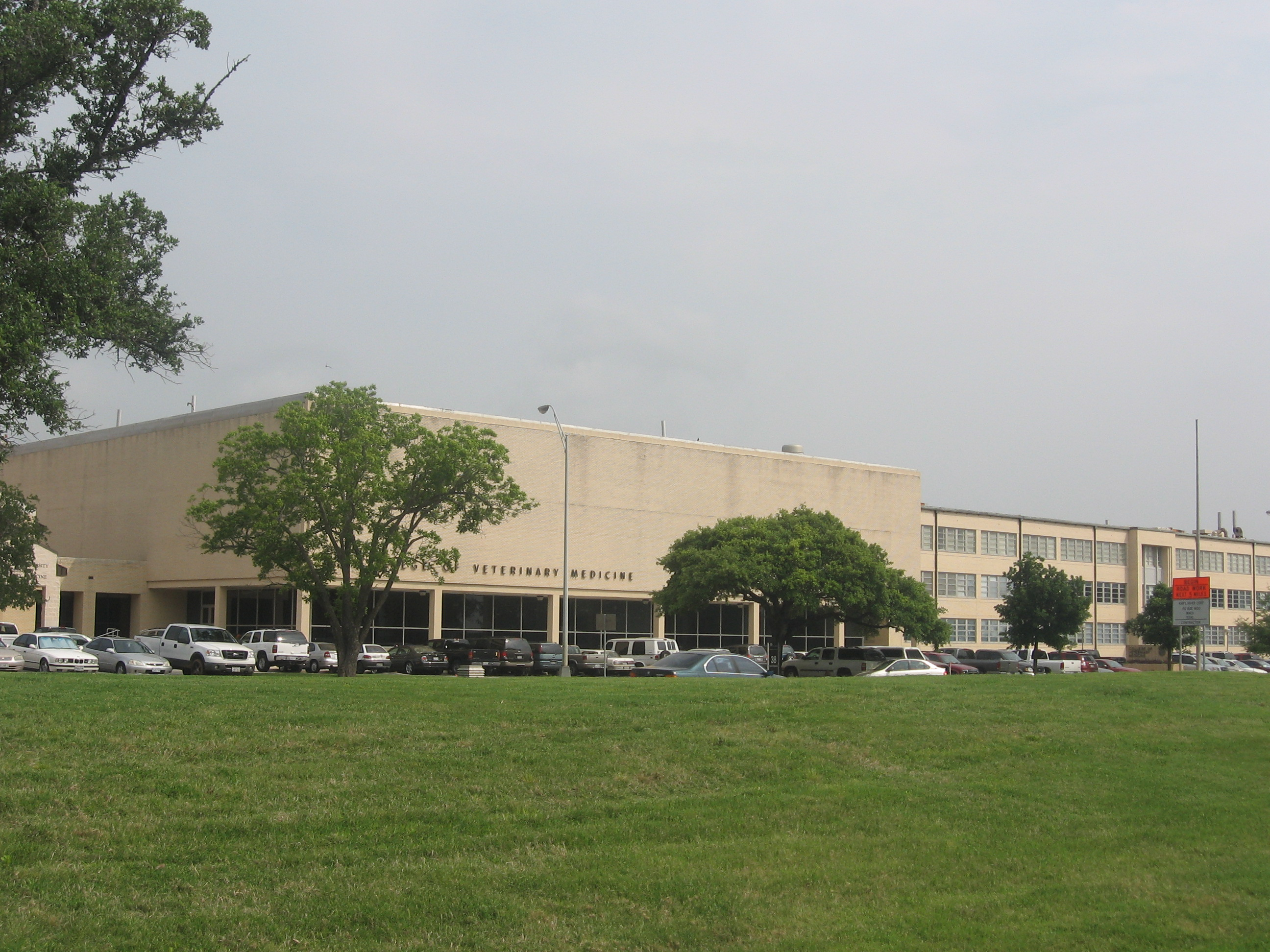
College of Veterinary Medicine & Biomedical Sciences at Texas A&M University

Veterinarians can earn several types of degrees, differing by country and involving undergraduate or graduate education. In the United States, schools award the Doctor of Veterinary Medicine degree (DVM). This degree is also awarded in Bangladesh, Canada, Ethiopia, Hungary, Iran, Malaysia, Nigeria, Pakistan, Philippines, South Korea, Thailand, Tobago and Trinidad. Other countries offer a degree equivalent to the North American DVM. In the United Kingdom and countries which have adopted the undergraduate system of higher education, a bachelor's degree is equivalent to a DVM (after five or six years of study). In the US, a four-year DVM degree such as Bachelor of Veterinary Science, Bachelor of Veterinary Medicine or Bachelor of Veterinary Medicine and Surgery follows a four-year undergraduate degree (eight years of study after high school). In Ireland, the Veterinary Medicine Programme at the University College Dublin awards the Bachelor of Veterinary Medicine (BVM). At the University of Edinburgh, the degree is BVM&S (Bachelors of Veterinary Medicine and Surgery, and the University of Glasgow, the degree awarded is the Bachelor of Veterinary Medicine & Surgery (BVMS). Some veterinary schools offer a degree enabling the recipient to practice veterinary medicine in their home country but does not permit the individual to take a licensing examination abroad; for example, veterinary schools in Afghanistan offer only the Bachelor of Science (BS) degree. Although Ethiopia awards a Doctor of Veterinary Medicine degree, it is not recognized in the US or Western Europe.

Nearly every country requires an individual with a veterinary degree to be licensed before practicing. Most countries require a non-national with a veterinary degree to pass a separate licensure exam for foreign graduates before practicing. In the US, the Educational Commission for Foreign Veterinary Graduates (ECFVG) administers a four-step examination recognized by all American state and territorial veterinary licensing boards, the US federal government, and the District of Columbia. The European Union enacted Directive 2005/36/EC to provide for Union-wide standards for veterinary medical education and the recognition of veterinary degrees from member states.

Licensure requirements are diverse. In South Africa, the Veterinary and Para-Veterinary Professions Act, Act 19 of 1982 provides for automatic licensure if an individual has graduated from one of several universities in South Africa, New Zealand, or the United Kingdom (including the University of Pretoria, Massey University, University of Bristol, University of Cambridge, University of Edinburgh, University of Glasgow, University of Liverpool, and the University of London as of 2008) or has passed the licensure examination administered by the Royal College of Veterinary Surgeons. All others must pass an examination and register with the South African Veterinary Council. India has a similar system, in which degrees awarded by certain schools are "deemed" to qualify an individual to practice veterinary medicine, but has forgone an exam in favor of state tribunals which investigate credentials and control a registry of licensed practitioners.

== Accreditation ==
All developed countries and most newly industrialized and developing countries accredit veterinary schools. Those in the US are accredited by the American Veterinary Medical Association (AVMA) Council on Education (COE) The EU is developing an accreditation standard, with accreditation usually provided by the European Association of Establishments for Veterinary Education (EAEVE) as of 2008.

Accreditation systems vary widely in developing nations. In Mexico El Consejo Nacional de Educación de la Medicina Veterinaria y Zootecnia (CONEVET) accredits veterinary medical colleges, although few schools are accredited. The accreditation system is poor (or nonexistent) in other developing nations; for example, Ethiopia has focused on building veterinary medical colleges rather than accrediting existing schools.

== Admissions and costs ==
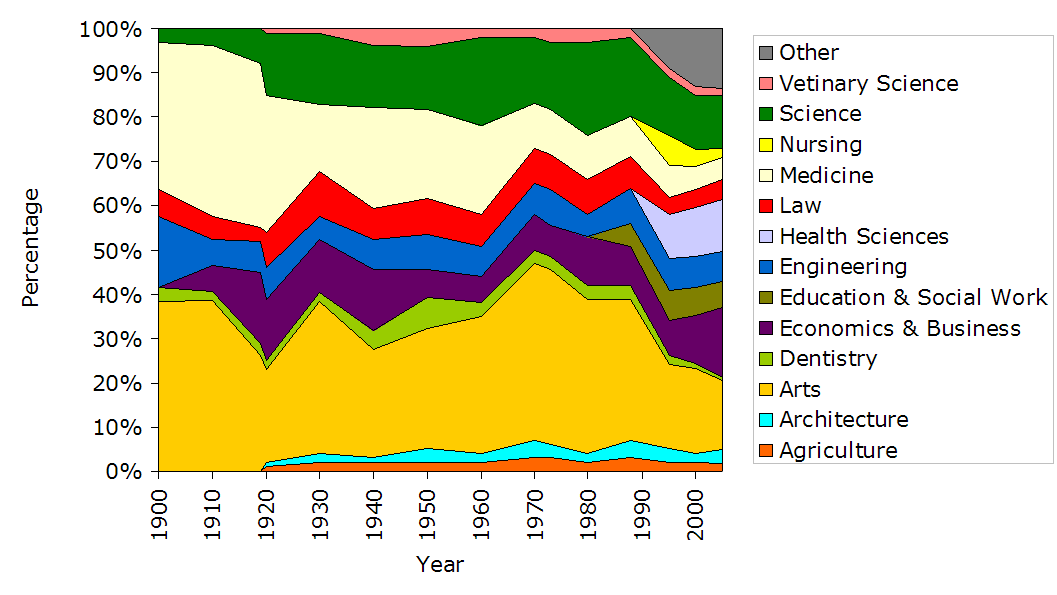
Proportion of students enrolling in each faculty at the University of Sydney from 1900 to 2000. Veterinary students are the thin pink line near the top, indicating the small number of places open to applicants.

Admissions practices, requirements and difficulty vary widely among veterinary schools and by country. Admission is generally competitive, due to the small number of places available. Most AVMA-accredited institutions in Australia, Canada, Ireland, New Zealand, the United Kingdom, and the United States share an online application system, known as the Veterinary Medical College Application Service (VMCAS). Many VMCAS colleges also have additional, individualized application requirements, and admissions standards are high.

Admissions standards in Europe, South America, Asia, and Africa also vary widely, with many veterinary schools limiting admission to students from their area, state or country. Twenty-five of the 28 veterinary schools in the US are public universities and, by law, may reserve few places for out-of-state residents. Other countries have similar schemes. In India, federal law requires each veterinary college to reserve 15 percent of its places for students from other parts of India. The Veterinary Council of India (a body of the federal government) conducts the All India Common Entrance Examination, and the top scorers are placed throughout the country.

== Curriculum ==
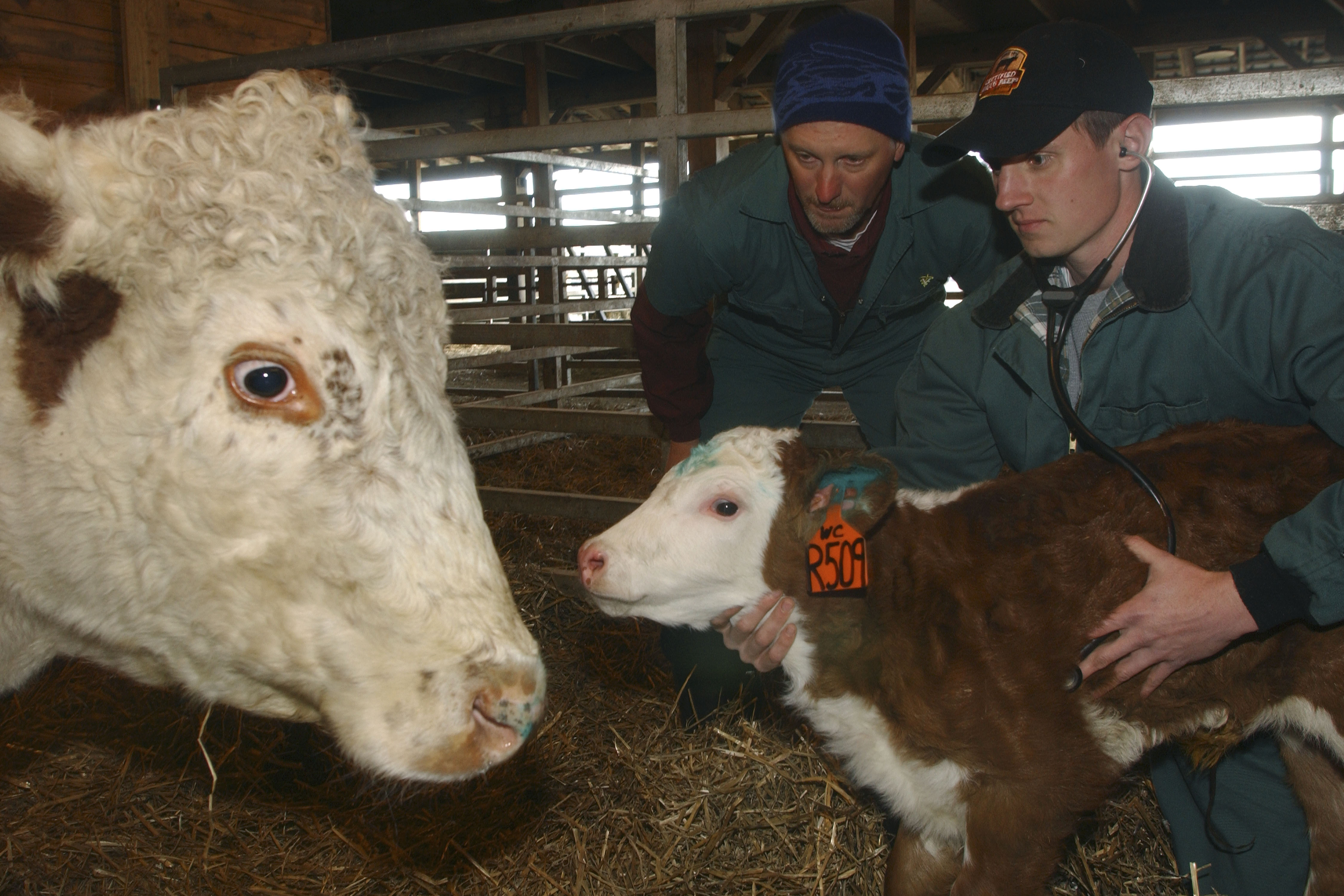
Student at the Virginia-Maryland Regional College of Veterinary Medicine receives clinical training in bovine health.

Veterinary school curricula are not standardized, with programs lasting from three to six years. In the United States and Canada the program is generally four years long, usually after a four-year pre-vet undergraduate degree). For the first three years, students learn anatomy, physiology, histology, neuroanatomy, pharmacology, immunology, bacteriology, virology, pathology, parasitology, toxicology, herd health (also called population health), nutrition, radiography, and epidemiology. During the third year, students learn anesthesiology, diagnostics, surgery, ophthalmology, orthopedics, and dentistry. For the fourth year, often 12 months long instead of nine, students care for a wide range of animals. Clinical education is a focus of most veterinary school curricula worldwide. In 2005, for the first time in its 104-year-history, the Veterinary Medicine Programme at University College Dublin instituted a lecture-free final year focusing on clinical training. The Institute of Veterinary Pathology at the University of Zurich has implemented a curriculum for teaching pathology with an extensive clinical component. Veterinary schools in Israel, Spain, the Czech Republic, and Slovakia also emphasize clinical training.

However, clinical training is limited in some schools and countries; In Sri Lanka, until recently there were few companion animals; veterinary education focused on herd health, with little attention to clinical skills. In Ethiopia few schools have clinical training facilities, and the government has prioritized opening more schools over improving existing colleges.

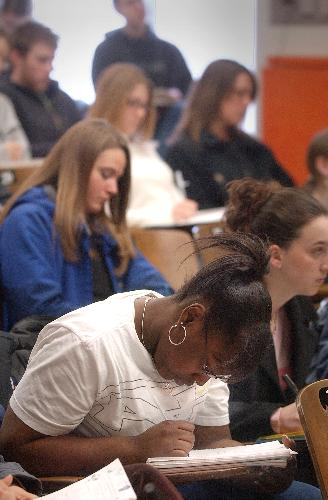
Students at the School of Veterinary Medicine at the University of Wisconsin–Madison take notes during a June 2005 classroom lecture.

Most veterinary schools do not allow students to engage in "species specialization", and students must be able to treat a broad range of species. However, most veterinary programs allow students to take elective courses which will enable them to specialize at graduation. Veterinary schools in Australia, Canada, the United Kingdom and the United States engage in "tracking", and students are asked which branch of veterinary medicine they intend to practice (such as companion animal, bovine, equine, food supply, avian, wildlife, and public health). Although tracking is controversial, about 60 percent of US and Canadian veterinary schools engage in full or partial tracking of students and there are calls for full tracking by some North American veterinary medical education organizations. It is argued that enhanced tracking should be linked to "limited licensure" of veterinarians to practice only in the species (or specialty) in which they were trained. Although very few veterinary schools require students to enroll in an internship or residency upon graduation, internships and residencies are often required for veterinarians seeking board certification in Canada, Europe and the US.

Lectures and rote learning are two of the most common teaching methods in veterinary education. To a lesser degree, outcome-based education, discovery learning, and inquiry-based learning are also used. Problem-based learning has been adopted in most veterinary schools in developed countries, particularly Australia, Canada, New Zealand, the United States, and Western Europe.

In the last years, the concept of competency-based teaching has been given a lot of attention and several universities teaching veterinary medicine are now adapting their curricula. Furthermore, the importance of institutionalized systematic teacher feedback has been recognized and tools such as clinical encounter cards are being implemented in clinical veterinary education.

== See also ==
- WikiVet
- List of schools of veterinary medicine
- Veterinary Medical College Application Service
- First professional degree
- Veterinarian
- Veterinary medicine
