= Maggie Tomecka =

Polish American soccer player (born 1982)

Personal information
- Full name: Magdalena Janina Tomecka
- Date of birth: April 30, 1982 (age 44)
- Place of birth: Gliwice, Poland
- Height: 6 ft 0 in (1.83 m)
- Position: Midfielder

College career
Years	Team	Apps	(Gls)
2000–2003	North Carolina Tar Heels		

Senior career*
Years	Team	Apps	(Gls)
2000–2002	Boston Renegades		
2004	Boston Renegades	8	(2)
2006	New Jersey Wildcats	10	(2)
2007	New York Athletic Club	2	(2)
2008	SoccerPlus Connecticut		(5)
2009–2011	Boston Breakers	11	(0)

International career
- United States U-18
- United States U-21
- * Club domestic league appearances and goals

Magdalena Janina Tomecka (born April 30, 1982) is a Polish American soccer midfielder who last played for the Boston Breakers of Women's Professional Soccer and is a former member of the United States U-21 national team.

== Early life ==
Tomecka was born in Gliwice, Upper Silesia during a period of martial law resulting from crackdowns by the People's Republic of Poland on the Solidarity movement and other pro-democracy and anti-communist movements. Due to the instability and general difficulties associated with life in Poland, Tomecka emigrated with her family to the United States in 1984, eventually settling in Shrewsbury, Massachusetts.

At Shrewsbury High School, she was a multiple letter-winner in soccer, basketball, and track and field. She led the Shrewsbury High School girls' soccer team to the MIAA Division 1 Central Massachusetts championship in 1999, her senior year, where they lost to perennial power Ludlow in the Central Massachusetts-Western Massachusetts championship game, who then lost to Newton North in the state championship game. That season, she was both a Parade Magazine All-American and an NSCAA All-American; she was also an NSCAA All-American in 1998. As a youth club player, she was part of state championship teams for Fuller Hamlet Soccer Club in 1997 and 1999. Her successes led her to the University of North Carolina.

== University career ==
Under the tutelage of famed coach Anson Dorrance, Tomecka was a four-year starter for the Tar Heels, earning a spot on the ACC All-Freshman Team in 2000 while winning a national championship. In 2003, alongside Hermann Trophy winner Cat Reddick and top scorer Heather O'Reilly, Tomecka captained the team that went an unprecedented 27–0–0 for the best record in NCAA women's soccer history, winning another national championship. During the offseason, she played for Boston Renegades of the W-League from 2000 through 2002. She graduated from UNC with a B.S. in biology in 2004.

== Post-university and professional career ==
Tomecka had intended to play in the professional Women's United Soccer Association, but the league ceased operations at the conclusion of the 2003 season. Due to the lack of a professional league in the United States, she enrolled in medical school at Ross University School of Medicine. After completing two years at the Ross University campus in Dominica, she had a strong desire to resume playing soccer, so she returned to the United States in 2006 and signed with New Jersey Wildcats of the W-League, while continuing her medical school career. She then joined the Women's Premier Soccer League in 2007, playing for New York Athletic Club, and again in 2008 with SoccerPlus Connecticut.

2008 also saw Tomecka earn her Doctor of Medicine from Ross University. Tomecka was completing her residency at UNC Health Care when her Connecticut Reds coach Tony DiCicco invited her to try out for the Boston Breakers.

== Boston Breakers ==
Tomecka successfully completed her tryout and was signed by Boston Breakers to a developmental contract on March 25, 2009. In June 2009, the Breakers promoted her on a full-time basis, and she started the final matches of the season at defensive midfield. In total, she appeared for the club in 11 games (6 starts, 653 total minutes).

== International career ==
Tomecka has represented the United States at the Under-18 and Under-21 levels. As she has not appeared for the United States senior team, she remains eligible to play for both the United States and Poland.

== Honors ==
North Carolina Tar Heels

- NCAA Division I women's soccer tournament: 2000, 2003
