= St. George's Anglican Church (Basseterre) =

Coordinates: 17.296165°N 62.719070°W

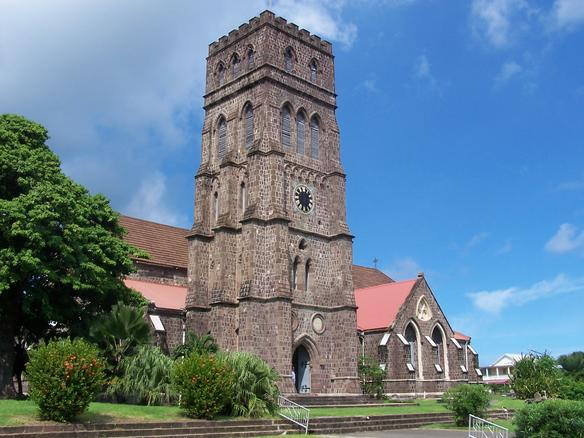
St. George's Anglican Church

St. George's Anglican Church is an Anglican parish church and Pro-Cathedral in Basseterre, Saint Kitts and Nevis.

== History ==
In 1670 French Jesuits built a church dedicated to Our Lady; in 1706, however, Notre Dame was burned to the ground by English soldiers billeted there. It was rebuilt and officially renamed in 1710 St. George's, in the incumbency of the Rev. Alexander Cockburn. St. George's was taken over for Anglican worship in the 1720s. It was damaged again in the fire of 1763, but once again restored. The earthquake of 1842, followed by the hurricane of 1843, reduced it to so ruinous a condition that an entirely new building was planned.

=== New church ===
The new church was to be built to the east of the old, and the cornerstone was laid on October 22, 1844. The church did not rise above its foundations; for twelve more years, the congregation continued to worship in the ruins of the old church. In 1856 the present church was begun, and it was consecrated on 25 March 1859. Seven years afterwards, it was gutted in the Great Fire of 1867; and was re-roofed, and restored in 1869. A pipe organ was installed in 1872 by the firm Booth of Wakefield.

=== Hurricanes and restoration work ===
In a series of hurricanes since 1989, the church was again damaged, but restoration work has since been undertaken on the building.
