= Juergen A. Richt =

Veterinary virologist

- Jürgen A. Richt
- Education: LMU Munich; University of Giessen
- Awards: National Academy of Medicine member AAAS Fellow; American Academy of Microbiology Fellow
- Scientific career
- Fields: Veterinary virology, veterinary microbiology, infectious disease, One Health
- Workplaces: Kansas State University; United States Department of Agriculture Agricultural Research Service; Justus Liebig University Giessen; Johns Hopkins University
- Thesis: Role of cellular immune reactions in the pathogenesis of Borna disease (1988)

Juergen A. Richt (also rendered Jürgen A. Richt) is a veterinary virologist and academic. He is a Regents and University Distinguished Professor at Kansas State University, where he is based in the Department of Diagnostic Medicine and Pathobiology in the College of Veterinary Medicine. He is also the founding director of the United States Department of Homeland Security Center of Excellence for Emerging and Zoonotic Animal Diseases (CEEZAD), which operated as an active DHS center through 2017 and has since continued as an emeritus center, and director of the National Institutes of Health Center on Emerging and Zoonotic Infectious Diseases (CEZID).

Richt has served as editor-in-chief of Virus Genes

== Career ==
From 2000 to 2008, Richt served as a veterinary medical officer and lead scientist at the National Animal Disease Center of the Agricultural Research Service, part of the United States Department of Agriculture, in Ames, Iowa. During this period, he also held an adjunct professorship in biomedical sciences at Iowa State University.

In 2008, Richt joined Kansas State University as a Regents and University Distinguished Professor and Kansas Bioscience Eminent Scholar. In 2010, he became founding director of the Department of Homeland Security Center of Excellence for Emerging and Zoonotic Animal Diseases (CEEZAD), which operated as an active DHS center through 2017 and has since continued as an emeritus center. In 2020, he became founding director of the National Institutes of Health Center on Emerging and Zoonotic Infectious Diseases (CEZID).

== Research ==
Richt's research has addressed the detection, pathogenesis, transmission, and control of infectious diseases affecting animals and humans. His work has been associated with the One Health approach, particularly the relationship between animal health, human health, and agricultural biosecurity.

His early research focused on Borna disease virus. At Johns Hopkins University and Justus Liebig University Giessen, he studied the immunopathogenesis and molecular biology of the virus, including the role of CD4-positive T cells in the pathogenesis of Borna disease and the characterization of the virus as a single-stranded RNA virus.

At the National Animal Disease Center, Richt worked on emerging viral diseases of swine and transmissible spongiform encephalopathies. His laboratory developed a reverse genetics system for swine influenza virus and contributed to the development of a modified-live swine influenza vaccine. He also studied the virulence of the reconstructed 1918 influenza virus in livestock species.

Richt has worked on animal prion diseases, including bovine spongiform encephalopathy and chronic wasting disease. His research included studies of cross-species transmission of prion diseases, the characterization of atypical BSE cases in the United States, and the development of prion-protein-deficient cattle as a model for prion research.

At Kansas State University, Richt's laboratory has studied animal influenza viruses, including highly pathogenic avian influenza viruses, Rift Valley fever virus, African swine fever virus, classical swine fever virus, Middle East respiratory syndrome coronavirus, vesicular stomatitis virus, SARS-CoV-2, Mpox virus, His group has developed animal models for emerging infections, vaccine candidates, and diagnostic approaches for high-consequence animal and zoonotic diseases. His research has also included gene-editing approaches, including work on pigs and cattle with reduced susceptibility to swine influenza virus and bovine prion disease infections, respectively.

== Recognition ==
- 2011: Pfizer Animal Health Award for Research Excellence, Kansas State University
- 2014: Iman Outstanding Faculty Award for Research, Kansas State University
- 2018: Fellow of the American Association for the Advancement of Science
- 2019: Agricultural Research Service Midwest Area Award for Excellence in Technology Transfer
- 2019: Extraordinary Professor, University of Pretoria
- 2021: Excellence in Research Award, Association of American Veterinary Medical Colleges
- 2021: Dolph C. Simons/Higuchi Award, University of Kansas
- 2022: Sir Arnold Theiler Memorial Lecture, University of Pretoria
- 2022: Vanier-Krause Endowed Professorship in Animal Infectious Diseases, Kansas State University
- 2023: South African National Research Foundation A rating
- 2024: Kansas State University Roots of Research Award
- 2024: Elected member of the National Academy of Medicine
- 2025: Kansas State University President's Recognition of Excellence Award
- 2026: Fellow of the American Academy of Microbiology
