= Berkeley Memorial =

Berkeley Memorial Clock Tower
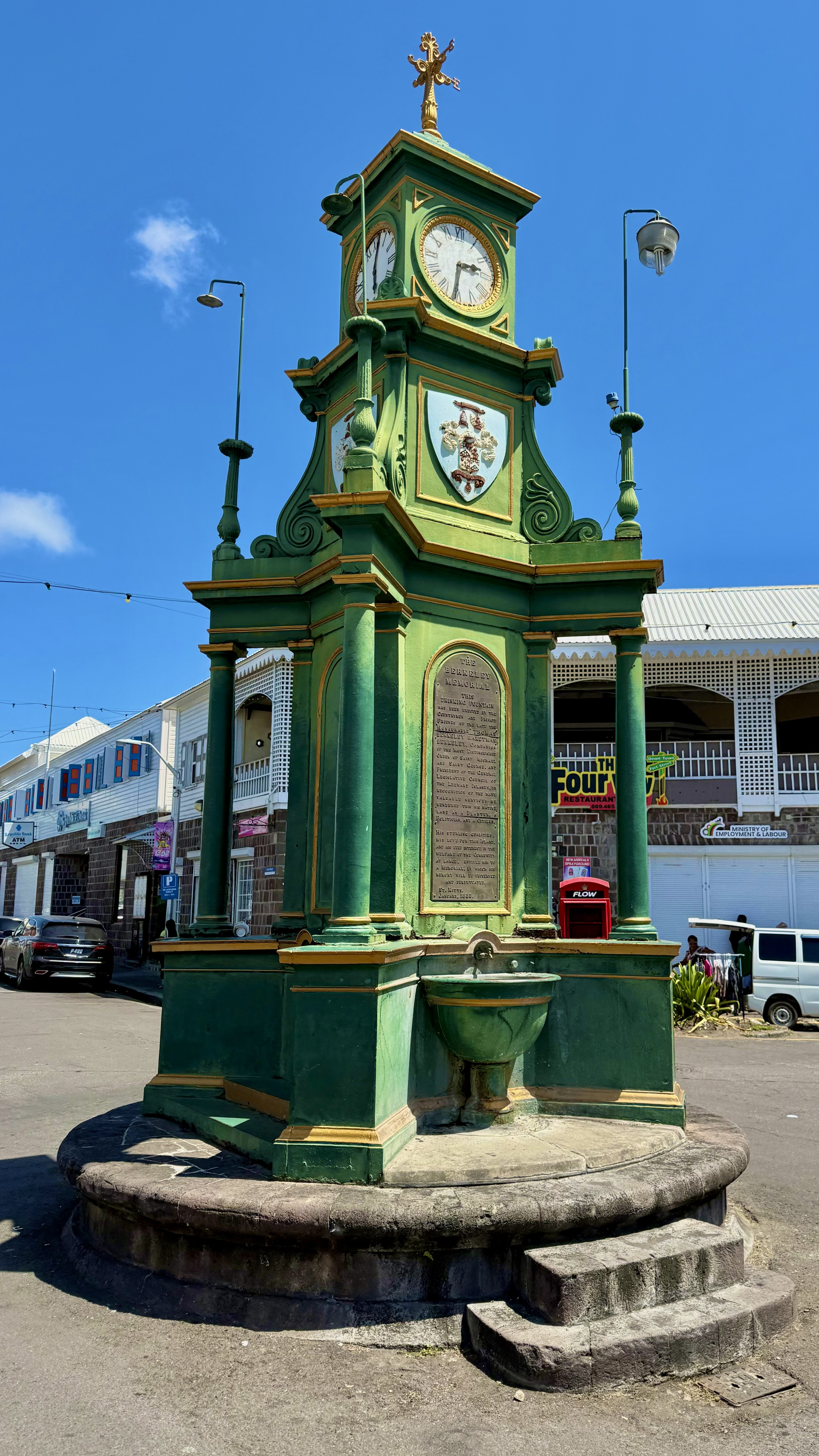
- Berkeley Memorial Clock Tower
- Location: Basseterre, Saint Kitts
- Coordinates: 17.295254°N 62.723737°W
- Designer: George Smith and Co, Glasgow, Scotland
- Completion date: 1883

The Berkeley Memorial stands in the centre of the Circus in Basseterre, Saint Kitts and Nevis. The memorial features a drinking fountain as well as a clock. There are four clock faces, each one facing one of the four streets leading to the Circus. It was built in honour of Thomas Berkeley.

== Architecture ==
The structure contains a clock and a fountain. It was designed and built by George Smith and Co. from Glasgow, Scotland. The foundry produced two other similar structures, but only that of Saint-Christophe survived.
