= The Girl Guides Association of Saint Christopher and Nevis =

- Country: Saint Kitts and Nevis
- Founded: 1931
- Membership: 290
- Affiliation: World Association of Girl Guides and Girl Scouts

The Girl Guides Association of Saint Christopher and Nevis is the national Guiding organization of Saint Kitts and Nevis. It serves 290 members (as of 2008). Founded in 1931, the girls-only organization became an associate member of the World Association of Girl Guides and Girl Scouts in 1993.

== See also ==
- The Scout Association of Saint Kitts and Nevis
