= Robert Ross (entrepreneur) =

American entrepreneur (1918–2011)

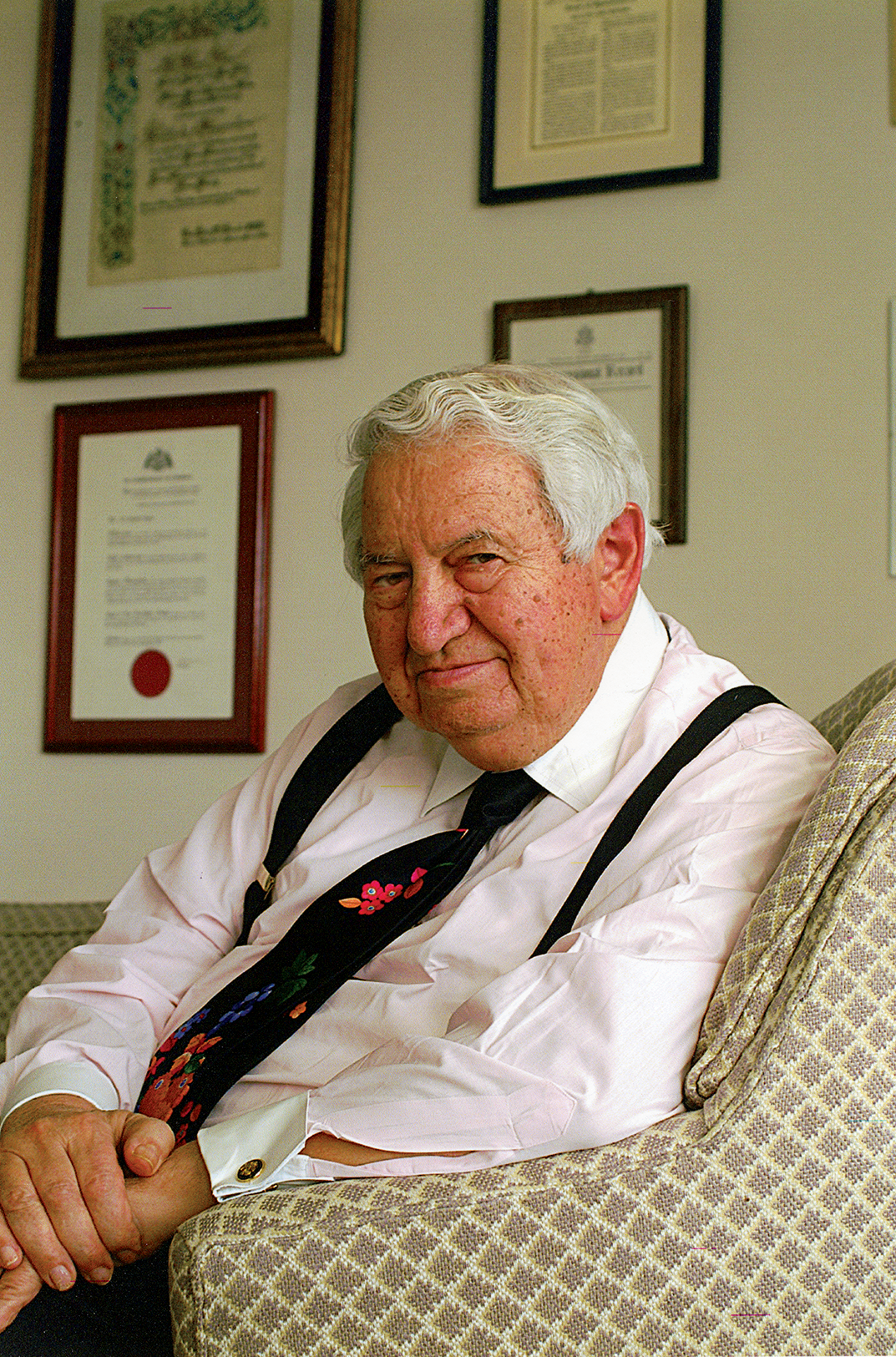
- Ross in 2010
- Born: December 26, 1918; Detroit, Michigan, U.S.
- Died: March 21, 2011 (aged 92); New York, New York, U.S.
- Known for: International business entrepreneur Founder, Ross University School of Medicine and University of Medicine and Health Sciences
- Spouse: Anne
- Children: 5

Robert Ross (born Robert Rosen; December 26, 1918 – March 19, 2011) was an international business entrepreneur who founded the Ross University School of Medicine in 1978 and the University of Medicine and Health Sciences in 2007 on the Caribbean island of St. Kitts.

== Career ==
Ross was born in Detroit, Michigan, and served in the U.S. Army during WWII. After his return to Detroit following his discharge from the Army, he began marketing television sets in anticipation of the post-war growth of television broadcasting. Later, he began marketing clothing and pharmaceuticals, expanding into various international businesses such as steel, petro chemicals, and electronics.

In 1972, Time magazine dubbed Ross, "one of the new Marco Polos", referring to his far-flung business activities. He was one of the first entrepreneurs to begin doing business behind the Iron Curtain in Eastern Europe with the then-Communist countries of Bulgaria, Poland, and Romania. His export-import business eventually expanded to include the USSR and mainland China.

Concerned about the shortage of physicians and believing that more medical school admissions were needed, he began the Ross University School of Medicine in 1978. In 2003, he sold the for-profit school to DeVry Education Group for $310 million. He subsequently founded the University of Medicine and Health Sciences on the Caribbean island of St. Kitts in 2007.

== Personal life ==
Ross was awarded an honorary doctorate in humane letters from the Southern College of Optometry in Memphis, Tennessee. He was married for more than 40 years to his wife, Anne. They had five children and maintained homes in Palm Beach, Florida, and Manhattan, where he died on March 19, 2011, after a 10-year battle with bladder cancer. He was 92 years old.
