= Chamberlain University =

US for-profit healthcare university

- Type: Private for-profit healthcare and nursing school
- Established: 1889; 137 years ago
- Parent institution: Covista
- President: Amelia Manning
- Location: 2817 W Roscoe Street, Chicago, Illinois, United States; 41.8332°N 88.0077°W
- Website: www.chamberlain.edu

Chamberlain University is a private for-profit healthcare and nursing school with locations across the United States and online programs. It offers bachelor's, master's, and doctoral degree programs in nursing and a public health master's degree. It is a subsidiary of Covista, formerly DeVry Education Group. The university is regionally accredited by the Higher Learning Commission.

== History ==
The roots of Chamberlain University are with its predecessor, Deaconess School of Nursing and its related organization, Deaconess Central Hospital.

The Deaconess tradition began in 19th-century Europe when Theodor Fliedner of Kaiserswerth, Germany, established the first Deaconess Home and Hospital in 1836. The word deaconess means “one who is devoted to service”, being the feminine gender of the word deacon. The modern Deaconess Foundation is a nonprofit organization dedicated to helping children in the St. Louis metropolitan area.

Deaconess Central Hospital was established in St. Louis in 1889 by the Evangelical Deaconess Society of St. Louis, which was part of the Evangelical Synod that later merged with other Protestant denominations to form the United Church of Christ. The hospital was first at 2119 Eugenia Street, then moved to 4117 West Belle Place in 1893, and finally ended at 6150 Oakland Avenue in 1930.

The hospital, by then named Forest Park Hospital, was sold to Tenet Healthcare Corp. of Dallas in 1997. In 2004, Forest Park Hospital was purchased by Argilla Healthcare Inc., which merged with Doctors Community Healthcare Corp. of Scottsdale, Arizona, becoming Envision Hospital Corp. It was acquired by Success Healthcare LLC in 2008. Its emergency room was closed in 2011 following many difficult years that included the laying off of the majority of their employees. In 2012, its property was purchased by the nearby St. Louis Zoo as part of a 20-year expansion project.

The Deaconess School of Nursing was established in 1943. It was purchased by DeVry (later known as Adtalem Global Education, Inc.) and became the Chamberlain College of Nursing in 2005. It was subsequently renamed Chamberlain University. Its headquarters is located in Downers Grove, Illinois.

In 2017, Chamberlain College of Nursing students in Texas protested a new requirement that they pass a comprehensive test to graduate. This followed the Texas Board of Nursing's decision to forbid Chamberlain from enrolling new students after a significant number of recent graduates were failing the National Council Licensure Examination (NCLEX).

== Academics ==
Chamberlain University has two colleges, the College of Nursing and the College of Health Professions. The university is accredited by the Higher Learning Commission with some specific programs accredited by other accrediting bodies. Degree programs include the Bachelor of Science in Nursing, Master of Science in Nursing, Master of Public Health, Master of Social Work, and Doctor of Nursing Practice.

== Campuses ==
- Addison, Illinois
- Atlanta, Georgia
- Charlotte, North Carolina
- Chicago, Illinois
- Columbus, Ohio
- Houston, Texas
- Indianapolis, Indiana
- Irving, Texas
- Irwindale, California
- Jacksonville, Florida
- Las Vegas, Nevada
- Miramar, Florida
- New Orleans, Louisiana
- North Brunswick, New Jersey
- Pearland, Texas
- Phoenix, Arizona
- Rancho Cordova, California
- Richmond, California
- San Antonio, Texas
- St. Louis, Missouri
- Stockbridge, Georgia
- Tinley Park, Illinois
- Troy, Michigan
- Tysons Corner, Virginia

== Student outcomes ==
The US Department of Education's College Scorecard reports the following regarding Chamberlain-Illinois:

- 74 percent graduation rate
- Median salary after attending of $55,000 to $71,000
- Repayment rate (2 years after entering repayment: 26% Making Progress, 26% Not Making Progress, 21% Forbearance, 15% Deferment, 6% Paid In Full, 3% Delinquent, 3% Defaulted, 0% Discharged
