= Ross University School of Medicine =

Caribbean medical school in Barbados

Coordinates: 15.556995°N 61.458431°W

- Motto: Dedita Scientiae Medendi
- Motto in English: Dedicated to the science of healing
- Type: Private, Medical School
- Established: 1978; 48 years ago
- Dean: Cheryl Holmes, MD, FRCPC
- Students: 3695+
- Location: Bridgetown, Barbados
- Website: medical.rossu.edu

Ross University School of Medicine (RUSM) is a private, for-profit medical school. Its main campus is in Barbados, and its administrative offices are in Miramar, Florida. Until 2019, the university's main campus was in Portsmouth, Dominica but is now located in Barbados. RUSM is owned by Covista Inc.

== History ==
=== Foundation ===
The medical school was founded in 1978 as The University of Dominica School of Medicine by Robert Ross, as a provider of medical education offering Doctor of Medicine (MD) degree programs, due to the scarcity of medical schools and physicians in the U.S. at the time. The university primarily serves students from the U.S. and Canada. In 1984, the university officially changed its name to Ross University School of Medicine.

Ross University School of Medicine's charter class had 12 students. In 2013, the 10,000th graduate of Ross received their medical degree.

=== Early years and controversy ===
In 1984, the New Jersey Board of Medical Examiners ruled that the Ross University School of Medicine could no longer send students to hospitals in New Jersey for the hands-on part of their training due to significant weaknesses in the educational program. In 1985, California state medical licensing officials (the Board of Medical Quality Assurance) began investigating RUSM, along with other medical schools in the Caribbean. The officials released a report stating that RUSM had nearly no admissions standards, and that the school was in the business of providing medical degrees to "everyone that wants one". Those events prompted RUSM to agree to implement a number of changes the California board recommended. RUSM has since graduated over 11,000 physicians eligible to practice in all 50 states.

On June 30, 1990, RUSM obtained recognition from the Medical Board of California. In October 1999, the New York State Department of Education approved RUSM students to complete more than 12 weeks of clinical clerkships in New York State.

In the late 1990s, RUSM expressed interest in opening a medical school in Casper, Wyoming, but accreditation was denied by the Liaison Committee on Medical Education, the organization that accredits M.D.-granting medical schools in the U.S. Some locals welcomed the economic impact of a new medical school on Casper, but critics questioned the quality of education at a for-profit institution.

=== 2000 to present ===
In 2003, DeVry Inc. (known since 2018 as Covista) acquired Ross University School of Medicine.

In September 2017, the Category 5 Hurricane Maria made landfall on Dominica, causing severe damage to its infrastructure. The hurricane knocked out communications, effectively isolating RUSM from the outside world. Students and faculty were evacuated from the campus to the U.S. mainland. In October, the university resumed classes temporarily aboard the GNV Excellent, an Italian ferry docked off the coast of St. Kitts. In November, RUSM temporarily relocated to Knoxville, Tennessee, to continue classes. Lincoln Memorial University (LMU), based in Harrogate, Tennessee, and with operations in Knoxville, provided the operational capacity and the technical capabilities to support RUSM faculty, students, and staff.

Ross University School of Medicine permanently relocated from Dominica to Barbados at the beginning of the 2019 spring semester due to extensive damage done in Dominica after Hurricane Maria.

In 2019, Ross developed partnerships with Dillard University, Charles Drew University of Medicine and Science, Florida Agricultural and Mechanical University, and Tuskegee University to "expand the black physician pipeline". It also added partnerships with Cal State Dominguez Hills and Oakwood University to increase enrollment.

== Accreditation and recognition ==
RUSM is accredited by the following agencies:

- Barbados Medical Council (BMC)
- Caribbean Accreditation Authority for Education in Medicine and other Health Professions (CAAM-HP)

It is recognized by:

- National Committee on Foreign Medical Education and Accreditation (NCFMEA) through the U.S. Department of Education, allowing American students to participate in the U.S. Federal Direct Student Loan Program
- World Directory of Medical Schools
- General Medical Council of Great Britain

The university also has state-specific recognition and/or approval from Florida, California, New Jersey, Indiana, and New York. RUSM is approved by the New York State Education Department (NYSED) to allow students to complete more than 12 weeks of clinical clerkships in New York State. It is one of eight Caribbean medical schools so approved by NYSED.

== Student life ==
=== Campus ===
The Ross University School of Medicine pre-clinical campus is at the Lloyd Erskine Sandiford Centre at Two Mile Hill in Barbados. This facility is divided between the university's campus and a conference center for the government. The campus features a medical and anatomical imaging laboratory and a clinical simulation center.

=== Housing ===
RUSM does not offer traditional dormitory housing options. Most students live in an off-campus university-affiliated housing complex within The Villages of Coverley, which features 2-bedroom, 3-bedroom, and 4-bedroom houses.

== Academic profile ==
=== Admissions ===
Ross University School of Medicine's acceptance rate is 42.7%. American applicants are required to take the MCAT. The average MCAT for admitted students is 493 (25% percentile).

=== Rankings and reputation ===
RUSM was ranked in the top tier of Caribbean Medical Schools by the World Scholarship Forum (2020) and in the top ten in a Money Inc. article in 2019. It is listed in the WHO's World Directory of Medical Schools.

=== Degrees ===
RUSM awards a single academic degree: Doctor of Medicine (MD).

=== Curriculum ===
The curriculum is composed of the medical sciences curriculum (first two years of the program) and the clinical science curriculum (last two years). The medical sciences portion follows an organ systems-based model. This is the most widely used model in American medical schools. After completing the medical sciences portion of the curriculum, students return to the U.S. to complete the USMLE Step 1 board exam. After successfully completing the exam, students begin their clinical clerkship at a range of hospital sites from Los Angeles to New York City.

The program's clinical science portion is composed of 90 weeks of clinical clerkships: 48 weeks of required core rotations and 42 weeks of electives, with the option to complete clerkships in the U.S. or the United Kingdom. The university has established contracts with hospitals to accept and place their third and fourth-year medical students in clinical rotations.

=== Academic outcomes ===
According to the U.S. Department of Education, 59.86% of students completed the program on time in 2018.

Pass rates of students and graduates on United States Medical Licensing Examinations (USMLE) in 2019 were as follows:
Step 1 – Basic Science 96.21%
Step 2 – Clinical Knowledge 89.23%

To be eligible to take the Step 1 examination medical students must first pass a practice NBME examination.

In comparison, the Step 1 and Step 2 CK pass rates among 110 medical schools as reported by the U.S. News Best Medical Schools rankings are:

Step 1 – Basic Science 96.3%

Step 2 – Clinical Knowledge 96.6%

RUSM claims that its graduates had a first-time residency attainment rate of 96% in 2021-22.

== Student loan debt ==
Median student loan debt for those who started in 2012-13 was $318,071. The U.S. Department of Education reports median student loan debt of Americans who attended was $349,973 in 2019.

== Alumni ==
Since opening in 1978, the university reports that it has graduated over 15,000 students who are practicing in the U.S. and Canada. A large proportion of them are primary care physicians, which is typical for Caribbean medical school graduates, with 2,611 of those being family medicine doctors. To put these numbers in context, a 2016 census found 985,026 active physicians in the United States, and it was estimated in 2010 that the active primary care physician population is 209,000. Per the 2018 FSMB Survey, RUSM is the international school with the second-most licensed physicians in the U.S. (after St. George's University), with 9,930 licensed physicians.

Notable graduates include:

- Maggie Tomecka, MD – Former member of the United States U-21 national soccer team
- Nicole Saphier, MD – Director of Breast Imaging at Memorial Sloan Kettering Monmouth, author, Trump nominee for Surgeon General
- Michael R. Williams, DO, MD – president of the University of North Texas Health Science Center

== See also ==
- International medical graduate
- List of medical schools in the Caribbean
