= American Association of Veterinary Clinicians =

The American Association of Veterinary Clinicians (or AAVC) is an association of veterinary clinicians that focuses on teaching and research in Veterinary Sciences. It was formed in 1958 by a group of clinicians of colleges of veterinary sciences and they assumed responsibility for the development of nomenclature and classification developed by the AVMA. A directory published by the association called Directory of Internships and Residencies is disseminated to students interested in Post Graduate Programs in Veterinary Sciences, including information such as the details of the program, faculty support etc. This program is called the Veterinary Internship Residency matching Program (VIRMP) and is similar to the Physician National Intern and resident matching Program.
