= Olivees Mountain =

Mountain in Saint Kitts and Nevis

Coordinates: 17°19′N 62°45′W

Olivees Mountain is the third highest peak on the island of Saint Kitts in the Caribbean.

== Geography ==
It is located within the nation of Saint Kitts and Nevis, in the Lesser Antilles.

Elevation

The summit of Olivees Mountain is 886 metres (2,907 ft) in elevation.

It is some 250 metres lower than Mount Liamuiga, which lies six kilometres to the northwest, and around a dozen metres lower than Verchild's Mountain, 4.3 kilometers to the northwest, both on Saint Kitts island.

== See also ==
- Geography of Saint Kitts and Nevis
