= Covista =

US corporation that operates for-profit colleges

- Formerly: DeVry Inc.; DeVry Education Group Inc.; Adtalem Global Education Inc.
- Type: Public
- Traded as: NYSE: CVSA; S&P 600 component
- Industry: Education; Healthcare
- Headquarters: Chicago, Illinois, U.S.
- Key people: Stephen Beard (Chair and CEO)
- Revenue: US$1.788 billion (FY 2025)
- Net income: US$237.1 million (FY 2025)
- Total assets: US$2.752 billion (FY 2025)
- Number of employees: 10,000 (2025)
- Subsidiaries: American University of the Caribbean; Chamberlain University; Ross University School of Medicine; Ross University School of Veterinary Medicine; Walden University
- Website: covista.com

Covista Inc., previously Adtalem Global Education Inc. and, before that, the DeVry Education Group, is a US corporation based in Chicago, Illinois, that operates for-profit higher education institutions, including American University of the Caribbean School of Medicine, Chamberlain University, Ross University School of Medicine, Ross University School of Veterinary Medicine, and Walden University.

Before June 2018, the corporation was known as DeVry Education Group Inc. Following a $100 million settlement with the FTC in 2016 regarding deceptive advertising, DeVry Education Group rebranded as Adtalem Global Education in 2017. Adtalem began the process to sell off DeVry University and Keller Graduate School of Management later that year to focus on healthcare professional education. Adtalem subsequently renamed itself Covista in 2026.

== History ==
DeVry Inc. was created in 1987 with the merger of DeVry Institute of Technology (DIT) and the Keller Graduate School of Management. DIT was established in Chicago as the DeForest Training School in 1931 and was acquired by Bell & Howell in 1967. Keller was started by two DIT teachers in 1973; the company acquired DIT from Bell & Howell in 1987. DeVry Inc. went public in 1991, moved to the New York Stock Exchange in 1995, and became known as DeVry Education Group in 2013. The company was previously based in Downers Grove, Illinois.

In 2012, the company moved 150 jobs from its campus in Roscoe Village to a new office in Chicago's West Loop. The company had additional offices in Oak Brook, as of 2013. In 2015, the company opened another office in the West Loop, after the city approved a $1 million subsidy for the company in the form of tax increment financing in 2012.

In November 2013, DeVry Inc. was renamed DeVry Education Group.

Adtalem agreed to purchase Walden University for approximately $1.5 billion in September 2020. The agreement required approval by the U.S. Department of Education and the Higher Learning Commission. When the deal closed in August 2021, Adtalem became the largest provider of graduate and undergraduate degrees in nursing.

=== Rebranding from DeVry Education Group to Adtalem Global Education ===
Following a $100 million settlement with the FTC in 2016 regarding deceptive advertising, DeVry Education Group rebranded as Adtalem Global Education in 2017 and began the process to sell off DeVry University and Keller Graduate School of Management later that year. Industry analysts characterized the move as an effort to move on from DeVry's legal, financial and reputational challenges.

The company's headquarters were later relocated from Downers Grove to 500 West Monroe Street in the West Loop Gate. In 2024, Crain's Chicago Business said Adtalem had become "the largest health care educator in the nation during a post-COVID period in which the health care sector has faced severe labor shortages".

== Operations ==
=== Campuses and enrollment ===
Adtalem's institutions operated approximately 130 campuses globally in 2018. Twelve of the 90 U.S. campuses were located in Illinois. In 2020, Adtalem's businesses operated 26 campuses in four countries and fifteen U.S. states. Approximately 90,000 students attended schools with a combined 6,100 faculty members. As of 2021, approximately 82 percent of the 140,000 students enrolled at Adtalem schools learned via distance education. In 2022, Adtalem operated 27 campuses and offered courses in 209 countries and territories.

In 2026, Covista and Advocate Health partnered to create a pipeline to place nursing graduates in the latter's hospitals. The collaboration is focused on Chamberlain University and seeks to address the nation's nursing shortage.

=== Leadership ===
Stephen Beard, who was previously Adtalem's chief operating officer, became the chief executive officer (CEO) in 2021. He was appointed the chair of the board of directors in November 2024, succeeding Michael W. Malafronte. Beard was included in Time magazine's 2025 "Time100 Health" list of influential people in the healthcare industry.

Chris Begley was the board chair in 2016. Daniel Hamburger and Lisa Wardell have previously held the CEO role. Wardell was appointed in 2016. She was the only Black woman to lead a Fortune 1000 company in 2018, according to Crain's Chicago Business. Wardell was also the board chair in 2019. In 2021, an analysis by the University of Illinois Urbana-Champaign ranked Adtalem in the top five Illinois-based public firms for both gender and racial diversity on the board.

=== Finances ===
In December 2016, DeVry Education Group agreed to a $100 million settlement of a lawsuit regarding deceptive advertising filed by the U.S Federal Trade Commission. Under the settlement, the group agreed to pay $49.4 million in cash to students and forgive $50.6 million in loans to students. In 2017, Adtalem lost approximately $4.6 million from the impacts of Hurricane Irma and Hurricane Maria. The company made a profit of $95.6 million in 2019 and lost $85.8 million in 2020, suffering from enrollment declines during the COVID-19 pandemic. In early 2024, Adtalem was targeted by a short seller and the company announced a $300 million repurchase program. In late 2024, Investor's Business Daily said Adtalem saw an average sales growth of fourteen percent over the last three years. For the 2024 fiscal year, Adtalem repurchased 5.446 million shares for approximately $261 million. In May 2025, the repurchase was completed and a new stock buyback program of up to $150 million through May 2028 was launched.

== Controversies ==
Covista, formerly known as DeVry Education Group, has been the subject of numerous investigations and lawsuits alleging that a variety of false or deceptive practices. While the group has generally denied the allegations, several cases led to multi-million dollar settlements.

In December 2016, DeVry Education Group agreed to a $100 million settlement of a lawsuit regarding deceptive advertising filed by the U.S Federal Trade Commission. Under the settlement, the group agreed to pay $49.4 million in cash to students and forgive $50.6 million in loans to students.

Months after the FTC settlement, DeVry Education Group rebranded as Adtalem Global Education in May 2018. Adtalem rebranded as Covista in 2026.

For-profit higher education in the United States has been the subject of hearings by the United States Senate Committee on Health, Education, Labor, and Pensions. Specifically regarding DeVry, the Committee found that over half of the students enrolled at DeVry in 2008-2009 withdrew by mid-2010. As of 2015, DeVry spent more on marketing than on student instruction.

As of 2013, DeVry Inc. was under investigation by the Attorneys General of the states of Illinois and Massachusetts.

In 2014, accumulated student loan debt from DeVry University and Keller, its graduate school, had reached approximately $12.1 billion.

A lawsuit filed against DeVry alleged deceptive recruiting practices in violation of federal law.

In January 2016, The Federal Trade Commission filed a lawsuit against DeVry Education Group alleging false or misleading advertising. A class action lawsuit was also filed against DeVry Group in US District Court, Northern District of California claiming breaches of contract, good faith and fair dealing, violations of the California Unfair Trade Practices Act, the California False Advertising Act and the California Consumer Legal Remedies Act, and negligent misrepresentations. A confidential settlement was reached.

In May 2016, a shareholder class action lawsuit was filed against DeVry Group, in the US District Court, Northern District of Illinois. The plaintiffs claimed that defendants made false or misleading statements regarding DeVry University's graduate employment rate and the earnings of DeVry University graduates relative to the graduates of other universities and colleges. The case was settled in 2019 for $27.5 million.

In December 2017, a former administrator filed a civil lawsuit number with the Los Angeles Superior Court, seeking relief for a number of causes of action including Retaliation and Wrongful Termination in Violation of Public Policy for complaining about an incentive-based compensation program that rewarded campus deans for recruiting and enrolling students.
