= Verchild's Peak =

Mountain in Saint Kitts and Nevis

Coordinates: 17.360°N 62.789°W

Verchild's Peak is a prominent mountain on the island of Saint Kitts in the country of Saint Kitts and Nevis.

It lies close to the centre of the island, and rises to a height of 900 m (2953 ft). It is some 250 metres lower than Mount Liamuiga, also on Saint Kitts island.
