= Spartan Health Sciences University =

Private medical school in Saint Lucia

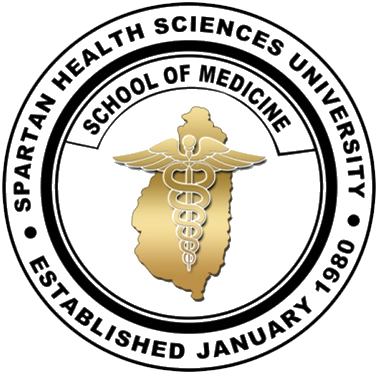
- Spartan Health Sciences University logo
- Former name: St. Lucia Health Sciences University (1980-1983)
- Type: Private, For-profit
- Established: 1980
- President: William R. Ayers, MD
- Dean: Gurumurthy, MBBS
- Location: Vieux Fort, Saint Lucia; 13.74841°N 60.971589°W

Spartan Health Sciences University was a private, for-profit medical school located in Vieux Fort, Saint Lucia, in the Caribbean. Spartan confers upon its graduates the Doctor of Medicine (MD) degree. Spartan graduates are eligible to practice medicine in 46 US states, and focuses on graduating doctors to work in the United States.

== History ==
Spartan was established in Saint Lucia on 7 January 1980, as St. Lucia Health Sciences University. The first campus was located in Castries, the capital city. In November 1983, the school was renamed Spartan Health Sciences University and relocated to Vieux Fort.

In 1989, Spartan University started to participate in the Federal Family Education Loan (FFEL) program under Title IV. They continued their participation until 1997. Almost two thirds of their student body received these loans. Due to a high default rate and inability to provide sufficient documentation during US Department of Education review of financial assistance at the school, the school was ordered to repay several hundred thousand dollars back to the program.

In 1997, it was listed from the World Directory of Medical Schools after the St. Lucia government awkwardly acknowledged the existence of the school. Relationships between the government and the school have since improved, and today some of their graduates intern in the St. Lucia Ministry of Health.

The school started a nursing program in 2012, which by 2017 had graduated two classes of St. Lucian nurses.

Public regulatory notes provided by the St. Lucian Ministry of Education confirmed that the university's local operational registration expired in 2022, with formal local data validations finalized on November 15, 2024. In 2025 the school was formally listed as not operational and closed according to the World Directory of Medical Schools.

== Curriculum ==
The MD program at Spartan is a 14-trimester course of study that consists of three trimester per calendar year. trimesters 1-5 are completed at the Saint Lucia campus; semesters 6-10 consist of 80 weeks of clinical study that are completed at teaching hospitals approved by the university.

Spartan also has a school of nursing. The nursing program was chartered by The Government of St. Lucia and is licensed the University. It is also accredited by the Monitoring Committee appointed by the Government of St. Lucia to ensure that standards are comparable to those set by the Liaison Committee of Medical Education as required by the Department of Education in the United States. A school of veterinary medicine was opened on January 14, 2015, and was developed in collaboration with Techmedics Inc. Dr. Viinay Sarikonda serves as the Asia Pacific President and Global Recruitment Head.

Spartan University operated, providing medical education and training to numerous successful graduates.

== Accreditation ==
Spartan Health Sciences University is chartered and licensed in Saint Lucia. The university was listed in the FAIMER International Medical Education Directory (IMED) and in the Avicenna Directory for medicine (both now continued) The school is listed in the World Directory of Medical Schools In 2013, Spartan was granted provisional accreditation by the Caribbean Accreditation Authority for Education in Medicine and other Health Professions (CAAMP-HP).

The regional medical-school accreditor, the Caribbean Accreditation Authority for Education in Medicine and Other Health Professions, or CAAM-HP, conducted a full evaluation in June 2023. In 2023 the school lost critical regional accreditation, triggering deep institutional and governmental intervention efforts in St. Lucia. At its meeting on January 24, 2024, the accrediting board decided to refuse every form of accreditation for Spartan’s medical school. Spartan had already exhausted the maximum period of provisional accreditation and was placed on probation for 2019–2022. CAAM-HP repeatedly requested evidence of improvement, but its reports indicate that many of the same deficiencies continued.

The final 2024 report used exceptionally strong language. The board concluded that Spartan had made little effort to achieve and maintain accreditation standards and characterized its conduct as showing “reckless disregard” for the welfare of students and staff. It nevertheless allowed students in their final year to transfer to accredited institutions so they could try to complete their education.

Saint Lucian news reports described the university’s programs as having stopped abruptly, leaving students uncertain about completing their degrees, transferring credits and recovering money they had paid. Students sought assistance from the Saint Lucian government after the institution ceased operating and lost its accreditation status.

== See also ==
- International medical graduate
- List of medical schools in the Caribbean
