= Faculty of Medicine of Homs University =

Medical school in Homs, Syria

Homs University - Faculty of Medicine
- كلية الطب البشري في جامعة حمص
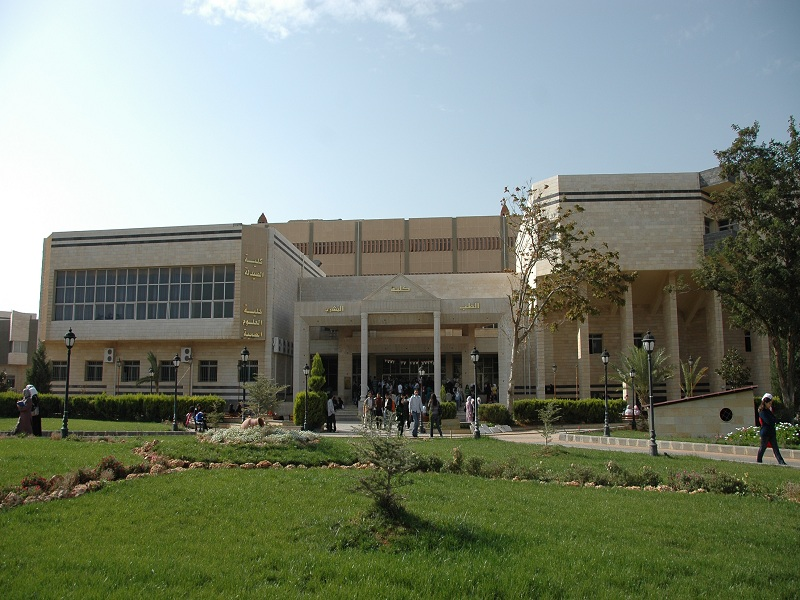
- Type: Public
- Established: 1996
- Dean: Prof. Talal Habush (since 2025)
- Location: Homs, Syria
- Website: homs-univ.edu.sy/med/

The Faculty of Medicine of Homs University was founded in 1996 in the city of Homs, Syria.

An approximate number of 500 students are added each year.

== Faculty Departments ==
As of 2025, there are 11 departments.

- Anatomy, Histology & Embryology
- Physiology
- Pharmacology
- Pathology
- Family Medicine
- Radiology
- Dermatology
- Internal Medicine
- Surgery
- Pediatrics
- Obstetrics & Gynecology
- ENT
- Oncology
- Ophthalmology
- Anasthiology
- Forensic Medicine
- Laboratory Medicine.

== International recognition ==
- The Faculty of Medicine of Homs University is listed in the World Health Organization's Avicenna directory.
- The Faculty of Medicine of Homs University is listed in the ECFMG IMED/FAIMER database of medical schools.

== Gallery ==
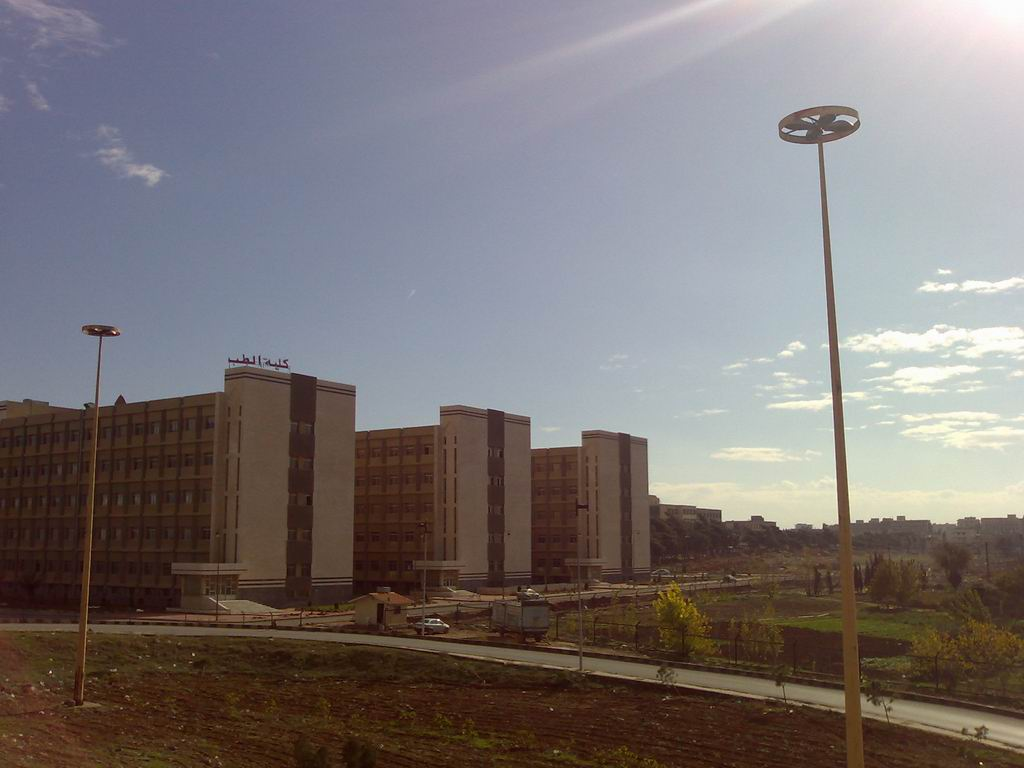
Faculty of Medicine
