= Faculty of Medicine of Syrian Private University =

Syrian Private University - Faculty of Medicine
- كلية الطب البشري في الجامعة السورية الخاصة
- Medicine and Syrian Private University Logo
- Type: Private
- Established: 2005
- Dean: Prof Dr. Nizar Daher
- Location: Rif Dimashq, Syria
- Website: www.spu.edu.sy/med/

The Faculty of Medicine - Syrian Private University (Arabic: كلية الطب البشري في الجامعة السورية الخاصة) was founded in 2005. It is the second faculty of medicine in a private university in Syria.

== Departments ==
1. Anatomy, Embryology and Genetics: curriculum includes Embryology, Anatomy (1, 2, 3 and 4) and Genetics.
2. Histology, Pathology and Forensic Medicine: curriculum includes Histology (1 and 2), Pathology (1, 2), and Forensic Pathology and Toxicology.
3. Department of Biology, Microbiology and Immunology: curriculum includes Biology and Cell Biology, Microbiology (1 and 2), and Immunology.
4. Department of Chemistry and Molecular Biology: curriculum includes General and Organic Chemistry, Medical Biochemistry (1 and 2), and Clinical Chemistry.
5. Department of Physiology and Pharmacology: curriculum includes Physiology (1, 2 and 3), and Pharmacology (1 and 2).
6. Department of Diagnostic Radiology, Radiotherapy and Medical Physics: curriculum includes Radiology and Radiotherapy, and Medical Physics.
7. Department of Internal Medicine: curriculum includes Internal Medicine 1 (symptoms, diagnosis) and 2 (digestive and blood disorders) and 3 (cardiovascular and respiratory) and 4 (neurological disease and kidney disease) and 5 (musculoskeletal diseases and infectious diseases) and 6 (glands, metabolism, nutrition and aging), Psychiatry, Dermatology and Sexually Transmitted Diseases.
8. Department of Surgery: curriculum includes surgery 1 (Microsurgery) and 2 (General Surgery, Abdominal Surgery) and 3 (Cardiovascular and Respiratory) and 4 (Neurology, Genito-Urinary and Pediatrics) and 5 (Orthopedic and Cosmetic); Emergency Medicine and Anesthesia and recovery, Otolaryngology, Ophthalmology and surgery.
9. Department of Pediatrics: curriculum includes Pediatric (1 and 2)
10. Department of Obstetrics and Gynecology: curriculum includes Gynecology and Obstetrics (1 and 2),
11. Department of Community Medicine: courses include Public and Occupational Health, Epidemiology, Biostatistics, Preventive Medicine and Family Medicine.
12. Department of Medical Education and Clinical Training: oversees strategic planning, development of curriculum teaching and learning mechanisms, clinical training and related activities.

== International Recognition ==
- The Faculty of Medicine of Syrian Private University is listed in the World Health Organization's Avicenna directory.
- The Faculty of Medicine of Syrian Private University is listed in the ECFMG IMED/FAIMER database of medical schools.
- FAIMER SCHOOL ID: F0002430

== University Hospitals And Educational Facilities ==
- On-campus teaching medical center (200 beds, 8 operating rooms (OR), radiology department, central lab, outpatient department, emergency department).
- Other affiliated hospitals include:
1. Obstetrics and Gynecology University Hospital.
2. Children's University Hospital(435 beds).
3. Damascus Hospital(645 beds).
4. Dermatology Hospital(34 beds).
5. Alzahrawi Hospital.

== Study Program ==
The medical curriculum is 6 years long, the first 3 years are the basic science years, and the last 3 years are the clinical education years.

== Degree awarded by the Faculty ==
The Faculty of Medicine of Syrian Private University based on the decree of the council of the Faculty of Medicine awards successful graduating students Doctor of Medicine (M.D.) Degree.
