= World Federation for Medical Education =

Medical NGO

World Federation for Medical Education logo.

World Federation for Medical Education (WFME) is a non-governmental organisation concerned with education and training of medical doctors worldwide. WFME's main objective is to "enhance the quality of medical education worldwide, with promotion of the highest scientific and ethical standards in medical education". The organisation develops standards for medical education and promotes accreditation of medical schools. It also co-manages the World Directory of Medical Schools.

WFME works in partnership with its six Regional Associations for Medical Education and other international organisations including the World Health Organization and the World Medical Association, with WFME's associate members, and with medical schools worldwide.

== History ==
WFME was founded on the 30 September 1972 in Copenhagen. The founding organisations included the World Health Organization (WHO) and World Medical Association (WMA).

In 1988 the Edinburgh declaration was approved at the World Conference on Medical Education, calling for greater co-operation between the health system and the education system, reflecting national needs in medical education and continuing lifelong education of medical staff to achieve quality in practice. The Declaration was adopted by the World Health Assembly in 1989.

The aspect of medical education responding to the national needs was also stressed at the World Summit on Medical Education 1993.

WFME participated in the Global Consensus Project for Social Accountability of Medical Schools initiated in 2010, which further focused on the co-operation and link between medical education and the society, highlighting the necessity to meet the health care needs of patients and societies.

In the years 2008-2014 WFME maintained the Avicenna directory, a public database of worldwide medical schools, schools of pharmacy, schools of public health and educational institutions of other academic health professions, which was later merged with IMED to create the World Directory of Medical Schools.

WFME previously had offices in Bethesda, Maryland (USA) and Edinburgh (UK), and most recently in Copenhagen (Denmark) and Ferney-Voltaire (France). The organisation is currently registered in the UK and France.

== Mission ==
The three major projects WFME currently prioritises are the creation of global standards for quality improvement of medical education, managing the World Directory of Medical Schools and the Recognition of Accreditation.

In developing Global Standards, the WFME appointed three International Task Forces, one for each of the three phases of medical education:

- basic (undergraduate) Medical Education (BME)
- postgraduate medical education (PME)
- continuing medical education (CME)/professional development of medical doctors (CPD)

Building on the standards, WFME provides guidance on establishing medical schools in the context of global standards but also with respect to the national need.

Together with FAIMER, WFME co-manages the World Directory of Medical School, a public database of medical schools worldwide.

WFME Recognition Programme aims to ensure that accreditation of medical schools in the world, is at an internationally accepted standard. WFME awards Recognition Status to the accrediting agencies that apply and are assessed to be up to the agreed standard.

ECFMG published a press release stating that students applying for ECFMG Certification after 2023 will be required to have graduated from a medical school that has been "appropriately accredited by an agency that uses criteria comparable to those established for U.S. medical schools by the Liaison Committee on Medical Education (LCME) or that uses other globally accepted criteria, such as WFME's".

WFME also develops a project on the Role of the Doctor in the modern society, reflecting the changing position of the medical professions in the world.

== Governance ==
WFME strategy is developed and agreed at the yearly Executive Council meeting. The Executive Council includes the directors of the six regional organisations, representatives of the founding organisations (WHO, WMA) and collaborating organisations (ECFMG, IFMSA) The Junior Doctors Network of WMA also attends by invitation.

== Regional offices ==
AMEE: The Association for Medical Education in Europe

AMEEMR: Association for Medical Education in the Eastern Mediterranean

AMEWPR: Association for Medical Education in Western Pacific Region

AMSA: Association of Medical Schools in Africa

PAFAMS: The Panamerican Federation of Associations of Medical Schools

SEARAME: South-East Asian Regional Association for Medical Education

== Affiliated organisations ==
WFME has been in official relationship with WHO since 1974 aiming to improve medical education worldwide. In 2004 the two organisations formed a strategic partnership and established the international Task Force on Accreditation in Medical Education. The role of WFME in this partnership is to "update global standards, review regional and national standards, collect and disseminate information, encourage institutional self-evaluation and establish an adviser function".

WFME has a formal relationship with the World Medical Association (WMA), and since 1997 with the International Federation of Medical Students´ Associations (IFMSA).

The Educational Commission for Foreign Medical Graduates (ECFMG) became a coopted member in 2007.

== See also ==
- World Health Organization
- World Medical Association
- Educational Commission for Foreign Medical Graduates
- International Federation of Medical Students´ Associations
