= All American Institute of Medical Sciences =

Coordinates: 18.027312°N 76.796382°W

- Established: 2009
- President: Viswanadham Pothula, M.D., MBA, MA, FACS
- Dean: Peter J. Horneffer, M.D., FACS
- Location: Black River, Jamaica
- Website: aaims.edu.jm

All American Institute of Medical Sciences is a private medical school located in the town of Black River, St. Elizabeth Parish, Jamaica, which began operations in 2009. It was chartered by the Government of Jamaica in 2009, and provisionally accredited by the Caribbean Accreditation Authority for Education in Medicine and other Health Professions (CAAM-HP) in 2010 with an annual renewal to 2015. The university began classes in 2011 at its Jamaica campus and graduated its first class in 2014.

== Programs ==
The primary educational program at AAIMS is a four-year program, which leads to a Doctor of Medicine (M.D.) degree. Half of this time is spent in Jamaica for preclinical sciences, where the remaining 2 years of clinical sciences are spent in Jamaica/U.S./U.K. at affiliated hospitals in clerkships. To meet with the requirements for clinical experience, the University partners with the Western Regional Health and Southern Regional Health Authorities, giving students experience at the Black River Health Department and May Pen Hospital.

AAIMS also offers a program in Associate Degree in Health Sciences.

== Accreditation ==
All American Institute of Medical Sciences received its charter from the Jamaican Government in 2009 and is registered with the University Council of Jamaica, as a Tertiary Level Institute in Jamaica. It is listed in the FAIMER International Medical Education Directory (IMED) effective in 2011 and in the World Health Organization's World Directory of Medical Schools. Students graduating from AAIMS are eligible for the United States Medical Licensing Examination and those who pass the examinations are eligible according to the Educational Commission for Foreign Medical Graduates to register for and participate in the National Resident Matching Program (NRMP).

AAIMS Associate Degree in Health Sciences is accredited by the University Council of Jamaica from March 01, 2019-February 28, 2023.
