= Lists of medical schools =

Medical schools are developed, monitored and credentialed by national organizations in each country. The agency responsible for this recognition in most countries is the Ministry of Health. Medical schools that are recognized by the appropriate agencies in their respective countries are listed in the World Directory of Medical Schools, which contains the combined data from the previous sources – the International Medical Education Directory (IMED) and the AVICENNA Directory.

IMED and AVICENNA were merged into the World Directory of Medical Schools in 2014.

The following are lists of medical schools (or universities with a medical school), sorted by region and continent.

- List of medical schools in Africa
- List of medical schools in North America
  - List of medical schools in the Caribbean
- List of medical schools in South America
- List of medical schools in Asia
- List of medical schools in Europe
- List of medical schools in the Middle East
- List of medical schools in Oceania

== See also ==
- Medical education
