= List of medical schools in Oceania =

The following is a list of current medical schools (or universities with a medical school), in Oceania.

== List of current medical schools in Oceania ==
Country, state, province or territory	School	Established	Degree	Regional/offshore	Listed in World Directory of Medical Schools	ECFMG eligible graduates (Sponsor Notes tab)
Australia	Main article: List of medical schools in Australia		Varies	Regional	Yes	Yes
Cook Islands	James Cook School of Medicine	1999	MD	Offshore	Yes	Yes
Fiji	Fiji National University, College of Medicine, Nursing and Health Sciences	1885	MBBS	Regional	Yes	Yes (From 1953)
Fiji	Umanand Prasad School of Medicine at the University of Fiji	2008	MBBS	Regional	Yes	Yes (From 2011)
Hawaii	John A. Burns School of Medicine, University of Hawaii at Manoa	1973	MD	Regional	Yes	NA
Maluku (province)	Universitas Pattimura Fakultas Kedokteran	2008	Dokter	Regional	Yes	No
Papua (province)	Universitas Cenderawasih Fakultas Kedokteran	2002	Dokter	Regional	Yes	No
West Papua (province)	Universitas Papua Fakultas Kedokteran (AKA: Universitas Negeri Papua Fakultas Kedokteran)	2014	Dokter	Regional	Yes	No
Micronesia (Federated States of)	New Tokyo Medical College	2012	MD	Offshore	Yes	Yes
New Zealand	University of Auckland, Faculty of Medical and Health Sciences, (satellite clinical schools at Waikato and Whangārei)	1968	Bachelor of Medicine, Bachelor of Surgery (M.B., Ch.B.)	Regional	Yes	Yes (From 1970)
New Zealand	University of Otago, School of Medicine, (satellite clinical schools at Wellington and Christchurch).	1875	Bachelor of Medicine, Bachelor of Surgery (M.B., Ch.B.)	Regional	Yes	Yes (From 1953)
Papua New Guinea	University of Papua New Guinea, School of Medicine and Health Sciences	1960	MBBS	Regional	Yes	Yes (From 1967)
Papua New Guinea	Divine Word University, Faculty of Medicine and Health Sciences	2016	MBBS	Regional	Yes	No
Samoa	Oceania University of Medicine	2002	MD	Offshore	Yes	Yes
Samoa	National University of Samoa, School of Medicine	2015	MBBS	Regional	Yes	No
Vanuatu	Hills College of Medicine	2017			Yes	No

== See also ==
- World Directory of Medical Schools
- International medical graduate
- Offshore medical school
- List of medical schools
