= White coat ceremony =

Ceremony in medical and scientific schools

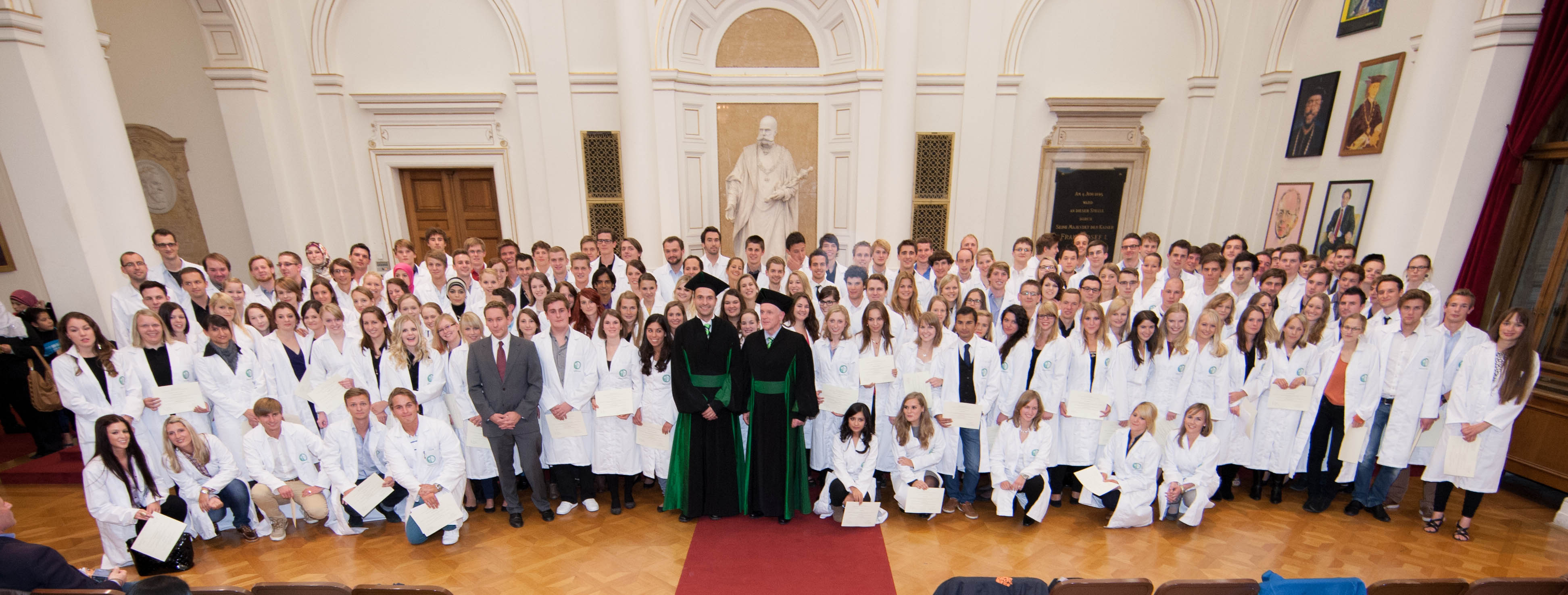
White coat ceremony in Graz, Austria, 2012

The white coat ceremony (WCC) is a ritual in some medical schools and other health-related fields that marks the medical student's transition from the study of preclinical to clinical health sciences. At some schools, where students begin meeting patients early in their education, the white coat ceremony is held before the first year begins. It is an example of a matriculation. The ritual is a recent invention, first being popularized in the 1990s. The ceremony typically involves a formal "coating" of students by giving them a white coat.

The white coat ceremony was first started by the Pritzker School of Medicine of the University of Chicago in 1989, and became a full-fledged ceremony at the College of Physicians and Surgeons of Columbia University in 1993.

== Description ==
Over 100 medical schools in the United States now have a WCC, and many students now consider it a rite of passage in the journey toward a healthcare career. Some schools also use this ceremony as a graduation from the entire program.

According to one author, R.‌ M. Veatch, WCCs have taken on a quasi-religious significance which symbolizes a "conversion" of a lay person into a member of the healthcare profession and is similar to a priest's ordination to the priesthood, although the white coat is a recent adoption by the medical profession. However, in many medical schools around the world students simply begin wearing their white coats during first-year anatomy class, without an official white coat ceremony.

In the nineteenth century, respect for the certainty of science was in stark contrast to the quackery and mysticism of nineteenth-century medicine. To emphasize the transition to the more scientific approach to modern medicine, physicians sought to represent themselves as scientists and began to wear white laboratory coat, a recognizable symbol of the scientist. Its continued adoption led to the more recent association of the white coat with medicine.

== History ==
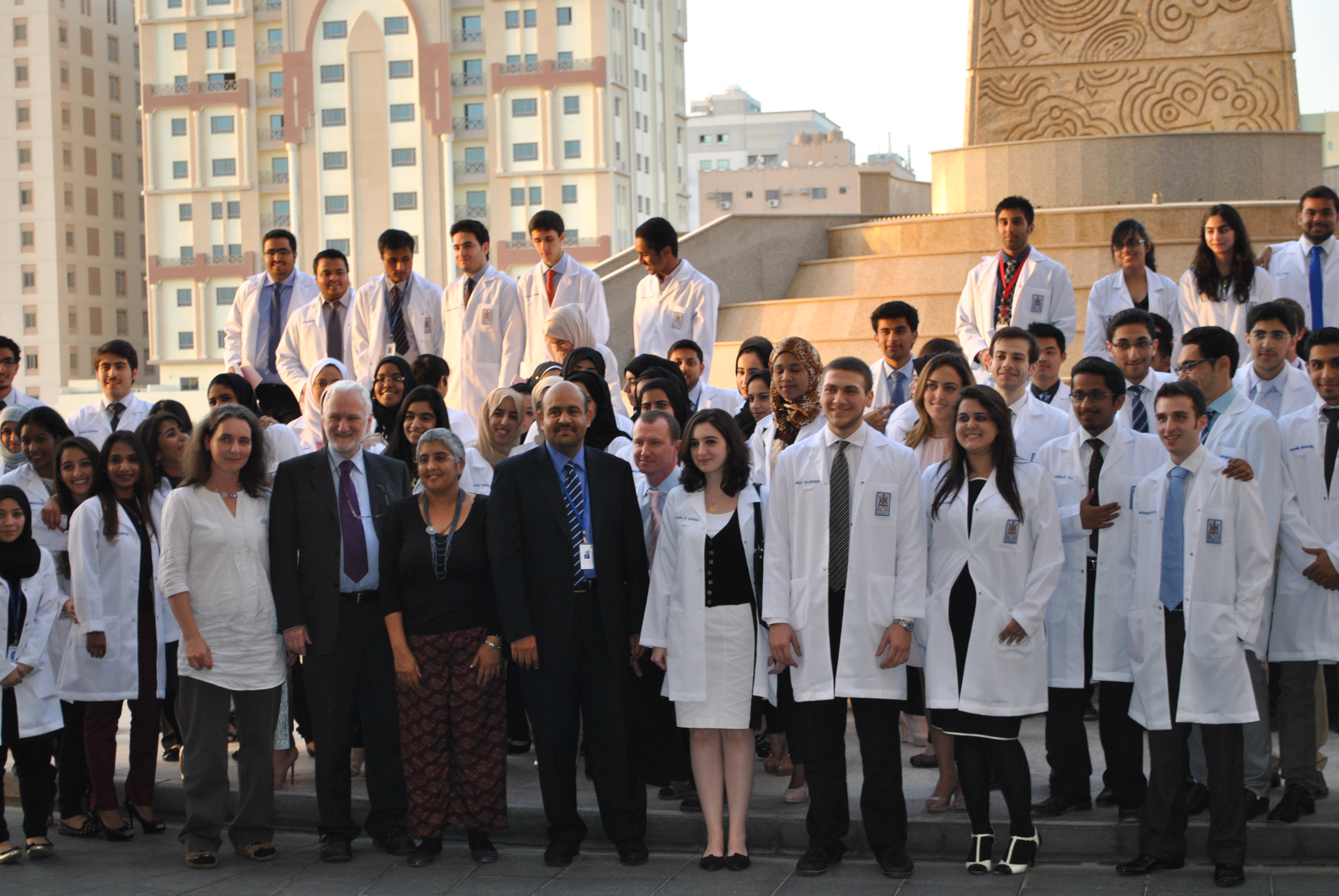
RCSI Bahrain students taking a group photo following the 2013 white coat ceremony

The white coat ceremony first started by the Pritzker School of Medicine of the University of Chicago in 1989, and became a full-fledged ceremony at the College of Physicians and Surgeons of Columbia University in 1993. In 1993, Arnold P. Gold, a teacher and pediatric neurologist, created the first full-fledged WCC at Columbia University College of Physicians and Surgeons. Before this ceremony, medical students typically received the Hippocratic Oath for the first time at commencement. This ceremony marks a change in tradition, introducing students to the Oath before starting their first year of study. This was intended to provide students with well-defined guidelines regarding the expectations and responsibilities appropriate for the medical profession prior to their first day of class. Since its conception at Columbia, the WCC has spread rapidly to schools of medicine, dentistry, pharmacy, osteopathic medicine, optometry, nursing, and veterinary medicine.

White coat ceremonies have also spread to medical schools in other countries, such as Iran, Israel, Canada, the Dominican Republic, Brazil, Poland, and others. The ceremony is no longer limited to medical students; starting in 1995, U.S. pharmacy schools started holding WCCs, with most pharmacy students receiving their coats at the end of their first academic year. In 2003 a survey found that the majority of US pharmacy schools hold WCCs. An Arnold P. Gold Foundation-sponsored version of the WCC, or a similar rite of passage, is currently used by 97 percent of Association of American Medical Colleges (AAMC)-accredited schools of medicine in the United States, and takes place at medical and osteopathic schools in 13 other countries.

In December 2006 the first white coat ceremony was held by Fatima Jinnah Dental College (FJDC), in Karachi, Pakistan.

In October 2008 the white coat ceremony was held at the VU University Medical Center Amsterdam—the first ceremony held in The Netherlands. In 2011 Erasmus Medical Center in Rotterdam also participated in holding the ceremony at their medical faculty.

On January 23, 2009, the White Coat Ceremony was held for the first time in Latvia, Rīga Stradiņš University Faculty of Dentistry, becoming the first higher education institution among the Baltic states to organize this celebration.

On October 13, 2010, the faculty of medicine at the University of Cologne, Germany, became the first German-speaking university to integrate this ritual into its programme. Initiated by then-student representative Hormos Salimi Dafsari in Cologne, the ceremony has been spread to various German cities such as Leipzig and Halle through channels of the German Medical Students' Association.

On April 12, 2010, the University of Queensland's School of Pharmacy became the first in Australia to adopt the ceremony for its incoming Bachelor of Pharmacy students.

On April 29, 2011, University of Warmia and Mazury in Olsztyn became the first medical school in Poland to introduce the white coat ceremony. In September 2011, Jagiellonian University in Kraków became the first medical school in Poland to introduce a white coat ceremony for the incoming class.

On February 28, 2011, the Faculty of Medicine at the University of Eastern Piedmont in Novara became the first Italian medical school to introduce a white coat ceremony for its third-year students.

On October 5, 2012, the Faculty of Medicine at the Grigore T. Popa University of Medicine and Pharmacy in Iasi, Romania, became the first Romanian university to integrate this ritual, for its first-year medical students, into the symbolism of developing as a physician.

On October 8, 2012, the Medical University of Graz became the first university in Austria to celebrate a white coat ceremony of its third-year students.

On December 6, 2012, the School of Medicine at the All American Institute of Medical Sciences became the first in Jamaica to introduce this ritual, for its basic sciences medical students.

In 2014 the Arnold P. Gold Foundation for Humanism in Medicine partnered with the American Association of Colleges of Nursing to pilot the white coat ceremony at nursing schools.

On July 13, 2017, the medical school of the University of Tripoli became the first Libyan university to introduce this event.

On September 18, 2019, the Faculty of Medicine of Tunis became the first in Tunisia to introduce this ritual in collaboration with Hygie Organization for the Promotion of Ethics.

== Controversy ==
In years past, white coats were generally reserved for attending or faculty physicians who wore long white coats, resident physicians who wore long or medium-length coats, and medical students, who wore short white coats. Increasingly, non-physicians and non-medical students wear white coats in the hospital setting. Some physicians recommend against wearing a white coat for infection control reasons, but other physicians don't wear a white coat because it no longer reliably identifies a physician in a clinical care setting.

In general, medical students are prohibited from wearing a long white coat. In many hospitals, non-physicians like phlebotomists, nurses, nurse practitioners, nursing students, and physician assistant students, are permitted to wear long coats. Some physicians and medical students have expressed frustration that a medical student has to "earn" a long white coat by completing medical school, but other professionals do not have to complete medical school. They think it's unfair.

== See also ==
- Academic dress
- Pinning ceremony (nursing)
