= Hashmat Medical and Dental College =

- Former names: Bint-e-Imam Medical College
- Motto: Professional Excellence
- Type: Private
- Active: 2011–2018
- Affiliations: University of Health Sciences, Lahore; Pakistan Medical & Dental Council; Higher Education Commission (Pakistan)
- Principal: Syed Qarib Abbas
- Location: Tanda Chowk, Jalalpur Jattan, Gujrat, Pakistan; 32.6422377°N 74.2061368°E
- Campus: Rural
- Colors: Maroon
- Mascot: Hashmatians
- Website: hmdc.edu.pk

Hashmat Medical and Dental College (Urdu:حشمت طبی اور دندان سازی کالج) was a medical and dental school situated in Jalalpur Jattan, in the district of Gujrat, Pakistan. It was recognized by the Pakistan Medical and Dental Council, the University of Islamabad, and the International Medical Education Directory.

Shilokh Mission Hospital was the primary teaching hospital to the college. The college was casually known as Hashmat and abbreviated as HMDC.

== History ==
Arif Chaudhry, the chairperson of Ibne Imam Degree Science College laid the foundation of the first medical college of Jalalpur Jattan at the annual gathering of 2011. The college was initially named Benit-e-Imam Medical College, which was indicative of it being the sister concern of Ibne Imam Degree Science College.

Benit-e-Imam started as a joint venture between Ibn e Imam Degree Science College and some shareholders. Before the commencement of the academic year, the college was renamed Hashmat Medical and Dental College. A new academic programme BDS was also introduced.

Professor Nasir Aziz Kamboh who previously served as the first principal of Nawaz Sharif Medical College was appointed as the principal of the college in late 2012.

The college is located within the premises of Shilokh Mission Hospital. It is located in the centre of the city opposite the Cathedral School.

== Teaching hospital ==
Shilokh Mission hospital is the teaching hospital attached to Hashmat Medical and Dental College. It is the oldest hospital of the city Jalalpur Jattan founded by the English in British India. It has a capacity of 350 beds. The hospital was run by a Christian missionary which had been taken on lease by the administration of Hashmat Medical and Dental College. Other teaching hospitals affiliated with the college included the National Teaching Hospital and City Hospital which are run by a private firm.

== Admission policy ==
The College admitted 100 students on self-finance. Admission was gender-neutral and was granted through an annual admission test called MDCAT conducted by the University of Health Sciences, Lahore. It granted admission to international students as well.

Hashmat Medical and Dental College has been closed on the orders of the supreme court of Pakistan.
