= Medical University of Graz =

Medical university in Austria

Coordinates: 47°04′45″N 15°26′58″E

- Medizinische Universität Graz
- Motto: "Pioneering Minds – Research and Education for Patients' Health and Well-being"
- Type: Public
- Established: 1 January 2004 (Faculty since 1863)
- Budget: 296.1 Mio. € (2022); Third-party funds: 69.3 Mio. €
- Rector: Andrea Kurz
- Academic staff: 92 (2022)
- Total staff: 2,735 (2022)
- Students: 5,110 (WS 2022/23)
- Location: Graz, Styria, Austria
- Colors: green, white
- Website: www.medunigraz.at

The Medical University of Graz (Med Uni Graz) is a medical university in Austria that has been in existence since 1 January 2004, and has been a part of the Karl-Franzens University of Graz as a medical faculty since 1863.

== History ==
The present Medical University of Graz traces its origins back to the former Medical Faculty of the Karl-Franzens University of Graz, which was founded in 1863 by Emperor Franz Joseph I. Medical education had been provided here as part of a medical-surgical curriculum since 1782. In 1912, the University Hospital Graz, one of the largest hospitals in Europe at the time, was established.

Since the enactment of the University Act of 2002 on 1 January 2004, the current Medical University of Graz (as well as the Medical University of Vienna and the Medical University of Innsbruck) has become an independent university. The university library of the Medical University of Graz was previously a part of the University Library Graz before the separation of the two universities.

The transition of the medical faculty into the Medical University took place during the founding convention under the leadership of Chairman Karlheinz Tscheliessnigg, with the election of the first rector, Gerhard Franz Walter. After Walter's first term as rector, the Medical University was led by the former vice-rector and chairman of the founding convention, Tscheliessnigg, from October 2007 to March 2008, until Josef Smolle was elected as the new rector.

In 2016, Hellmut Samonigg became rector of the Medical University of Graz.

Since 2024, Andrea Kurz, Vice-Chair for Research in the Anesthesiology Institute at the Cleveland Clinic, has been rector of the Medical University of Graz.

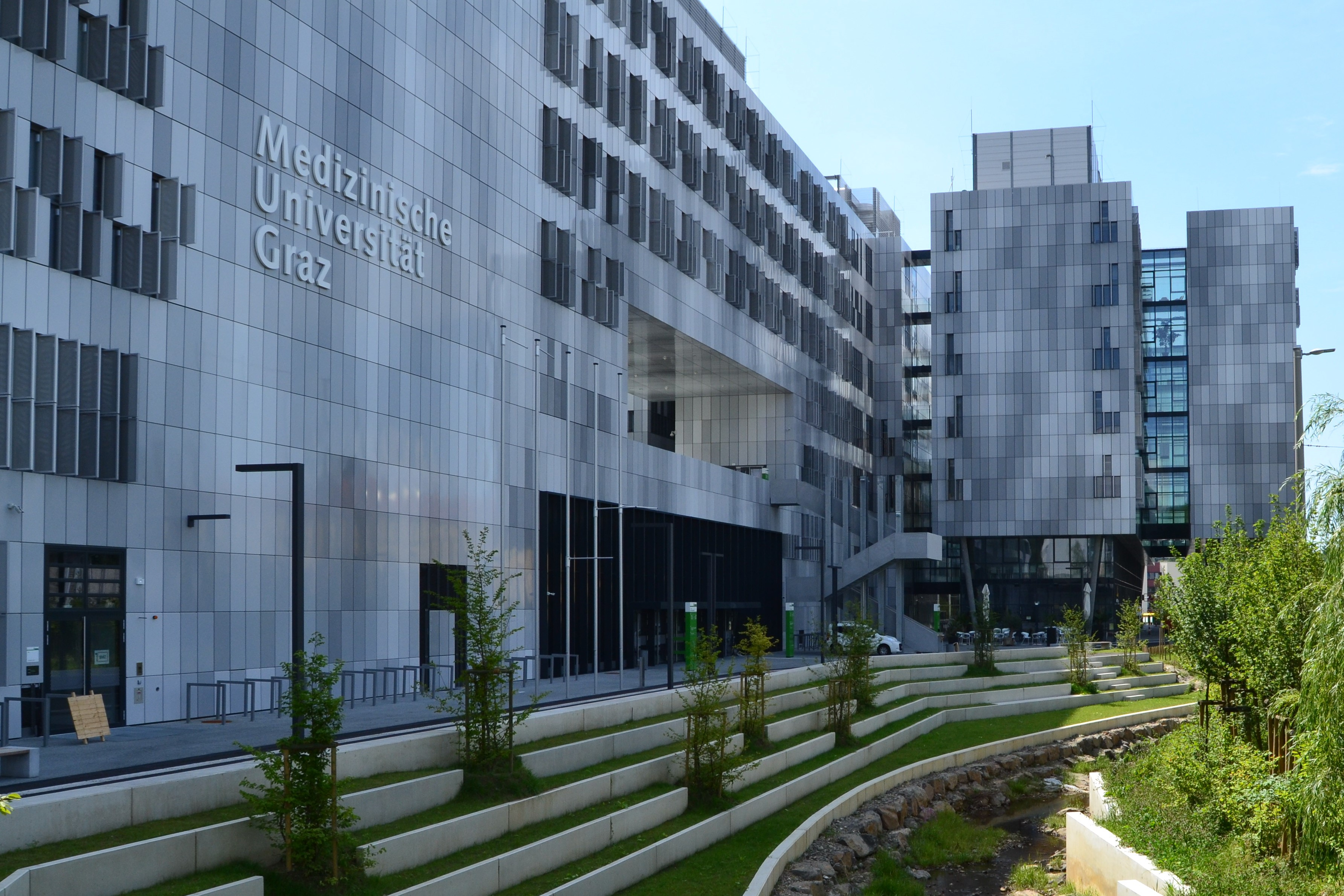
New Campus (2016)

== Committees and management ==
=== Rectorate ===
The rector of the Medical University of Graz since 15 February 2016 is Hellmut Samonigg. Samonigg is an oncologist and is known to the public as the initiator of the expert initiative and campaign "Don't Smoke" against tobacco smoking. His second term began on 15 February 2020 with Vice Rectors Caroline Schober-Trummler (Research and International), Andreas Leithner (Clinical Affairs), Sabine Vogl (Studies and Teaching), and Birgit Hochenegger-Stoirer (Financial Management, Law, and Digitalization).

Gerhard Franz Walter was the rector of the Med Uni Graz from 2004 to 2008, followed by Josef Smolle, who served as rector of the Medical University of Graz from 2008 to 2016.

Andrea Kurz was elected by the university council as Hellmut Samonigg's successor starting on 15 February 2024.

=== Senate ===
The Senate consists of 9 professors, 4 student members, 4 members of the middle class, and a representative of the general university staff. Alexander Rosenkranz chairs the Senate meetings.

=== University Council ===
Since 1 March 2023 the University Council has included Iris Eisenberger, Alfred Gutschelhofer, Michael Heinisch (Vorsitzender), Sylvia Knapp (Stv. Vorsitzende), Winfried Pinggera, Bettina Theresia Resl und Annemarie Weißenbacher an.

=== Dean ===
Dean for doctoral studies is Christian Wadsack, Kathrin Eller serves as vice dean. Dean for study-related legal matters is Erwin Petek, and Eva Reininghaus serves as vice dean.

=== Austrian National Union of Students ===
The Austrian National Union of Students, also known as "Hochschülerinnen- und Hochschülerschaft (ÖH) Med Graz", represents the students. It consists of the university representation and the study representations for human medicine, dentistry, health and nursing science, and doctoral studies. According to the University Act, general elections are held every two years. In the last ÖH election in 2019, the list herzlinks.at, which is part of the Austrian National Union of Socialist Students and part of the Verband Sozialistischer Studentinnen und Studenten Österreichs, received 70.45% of the votes (seven mandates), while the list JUNOS - Junge liberale Studierende received 19.86% (two mandates). The current executive team of the university representation consists of Johanna Brehmer (chairwoman), Laurin Erlacher (1st deputy chairman), and Lukas Jager (2nd deputy chairman).

The magazine of ÖH Med Graz, medizynisch, was named the third-best medical student magazine in German-speaking countries in 2008. The news magazine of Med Uni Graz is called MEDitio.

On 8 October 2012 the very first white coat ceremony (WCC) in Austria was held as a cooperative project with the Austrian National Union of Students at the Medical University of Graz. This represented a major leap in promoting corporate identity and student identification with their alma mater.

== Curriculum ==
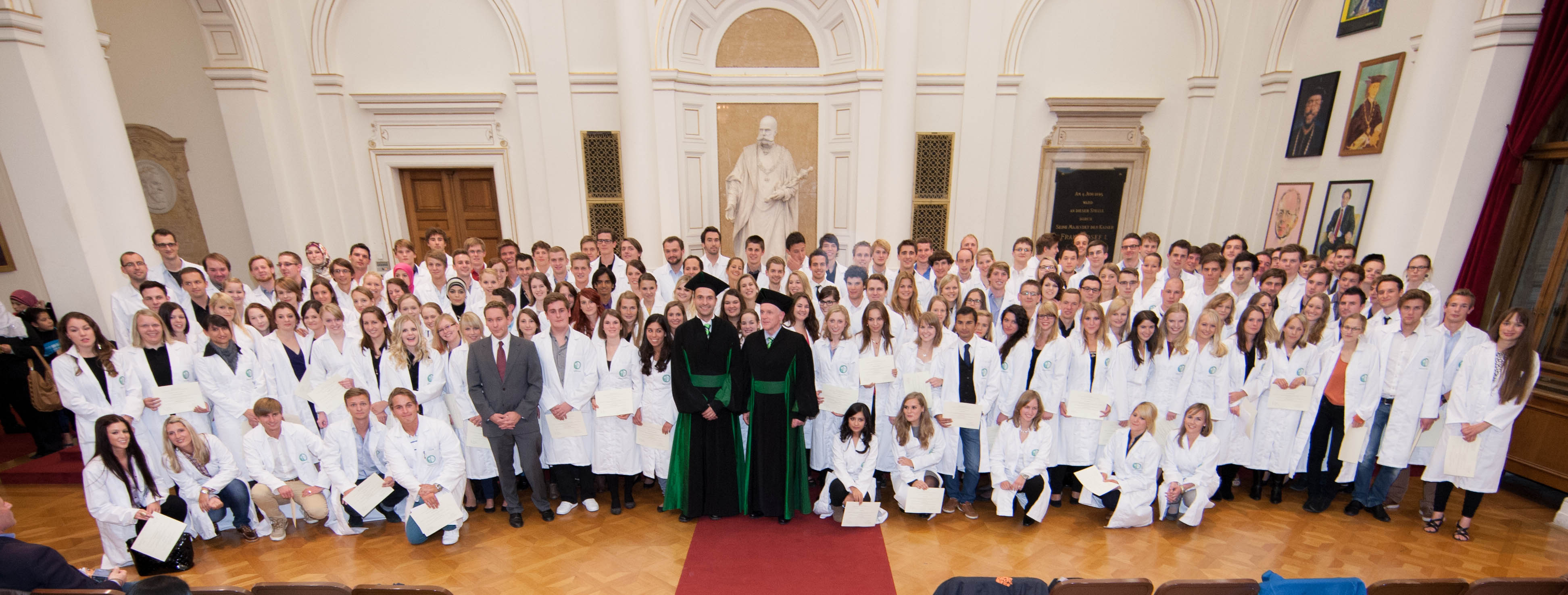
White Coat Ceremony in Graz (Austria) 2012

On 8 October 2012, the Medical University of Graz became the first university in Austria to celebrate a White Coat Ceremony of its third-year students.
