= White coat =

Coat worn by medics and scientists

Students in white coats

A white coat, also known as a laboratory coat, lab gown, or lab coat, is a knee-length overcoat or smock worn by professionals in the medical field or by those involved in laboratory work. The coat protects their street clothes and also serves as a simple uniform. The garment is made from white or light-colored cotton, linen, or cotton polyester blend, allowing it to be washed at high temperature and making it easy to see if it is clean.

Similar coats are a symbol of learning in Argentina and Uruguay, where they are worn by both students and teachers in state schools. In Tunisia and Mozambique, teachers wear white coats to protect their street clothes from chalk.

Like the word "suit", the phrase "white coat" is sometimes used as a metonym to denote the wearer, such as a scientist working in a high-tech company.

== Medicine ==
White coats are sometimes seen as the distinctive dress of both physicians and surgeons, who have worn them for over 100 years. In the nineteenth century, respect for the certainty of science was in stark contrast to the quackery and mysticism of nineteenth-century medicine. To emphasize the transition to the more scientific approach of modern medicine, physicians began to represent themselves as scientists, donning the most recognizable symbol of the scientist, the white laboratory coat. The modern white coat was introduced to medicine in the late 1800s as a symbol of cleanliness.

=== Patient perceptions ===
A study conducted in the United Kingdom found that the majority of patients prefer their doctors to wear white coats, but the majority of doctors prefer other clothing, such as scrubs. The study found that psychiatrists were among the least likely to wear white coats and when they are worn, they are typically worn over the scrubs. Some medical doctors view the coats as hot and uncomfortable, and many feel that they spread infection.

=== White coat hypertension ===
Some patients who have their blood pressure measured in a clinical setting have higher readings than they do when measured in a home setting. This is apparently a result of patients feeling more relaxed when they are at home. The phenomenon is sometimes called white coat hypertension, in reference to the traditional white coats worn in a clinical setting, though the coats themselves may have nothing to do with the elevated readings.

=== Psychiatry ===
The term is also used as verbal shorthand for psychiatric orderlies or other personnel and may be used, in a usually jocular manner, to imply someone's lunacy or paranoia.

=== Infection control concerns ===
Studies have shown that doctor's coats worn in hospitals can harbor contagions including MRSA.

In 2007, the UK National Health Service (NHS) started banning long-sleeved coats.

In 2009, the American Medical Association investigated banning coats with long sleeves to protect patients, but did not institute a ban.

A study published in 2011 investigating the effectiveness of the NHS ban showed no statistical difference in contamination levels over an 8-hour period between residents wearing long-sleeved coats and those wearing short-sleeved scrubs.

In an effort to reduce the contamination of healthcare uniforms, ASTM International is developing standards to specifically address liquid penetration resistance, liquid repellency, bacterial decontamination, and antimicrobial properties of such uniforms. The spread of white coat infection has been rampant and talked about in the scientific community.

Indian physician Edmond Fernandes triggered a controversy in India and parts of South Asia by calling for a ban on white coats because of the spread of nosocomial infections.

=== Non-physician use ===
In the United States, it has become more common for non-physician roles to wear white coats in clinical settings, with positions such as mid-level practitioners, nurse administrators, clinical social workers, and other healthcare fields donning the coats. Some nursing schools even provide white coat ceremonies to new nursing students.

== In laboratory work ==
When used in the laboratory, lab coats protect against accidental spills, e.g., acids. In this case, they usually have long sleeves and are made of absorbent material, such as cotton, so that the user can be protected from the chemical. Some lab coats have buttons or elastic at the end of the sleeves, to secure them around the wrist so that they do not hang into containers of chemicals or tip over lab equipment. Higher quality coats use snap-on buttons instead of traditional buttons as these are easier to quickly undo (they allow pulling the coat off directly instead of fumbling with the buttons to unhook each one). This renders taking off the coat in an emergency much faster, so these are the preferred type for laboratory work as opposed to clinical work. Short-sleeved lab coats also exist where protection from substances such as acid is not necessary, and are favored by certain scientists, such as microbiologists, avoiding the problem of hanging sleeves altogether, combined with the ease of washing the forearms (an important consideration in microbiology).

=== Howie coats ===
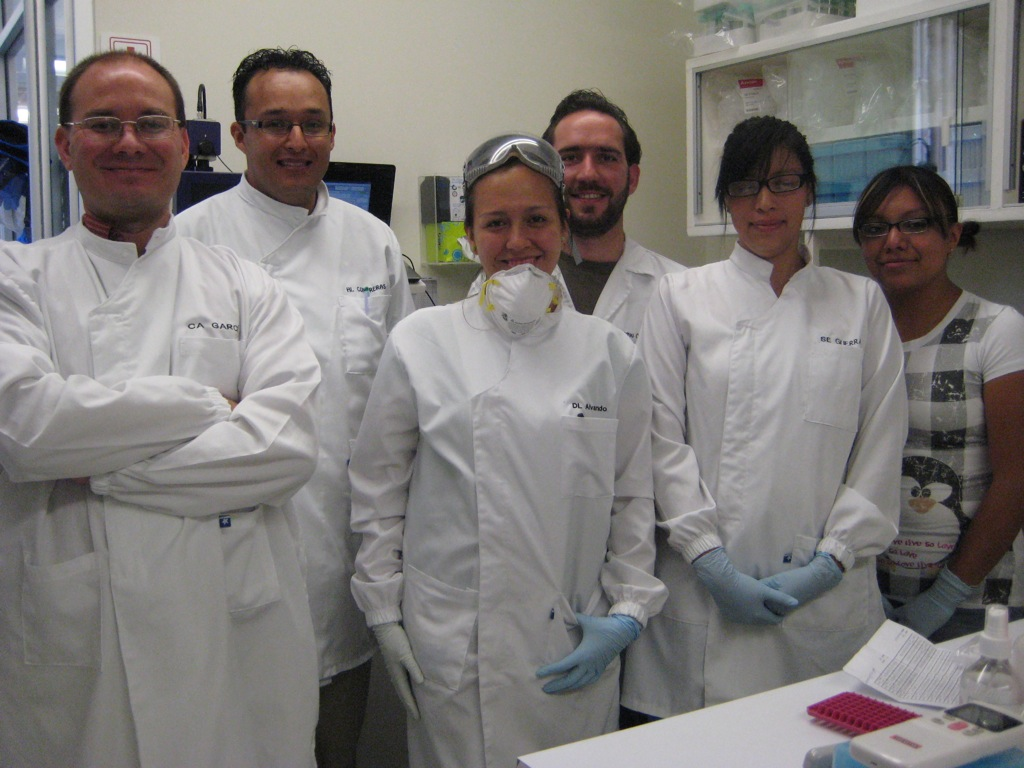
Viral & Human Genomics Laboratory (Facultad de Medicina UASLP) team members using Howie lab coats

For added safety, a variant of the lab coat called a "Howie" style lab coat is often adopted. It is called such after a 1978 report commissioned by the UK Department of Health and Social Security to codify standard clinical laboratory practices, chaired by James Howie. Among the codified standards was protective clothing; the type of wrap-around full coverage lab coat that had been in use in the UK for over a hundred years was nicknamed the "Howie-Style" coat to indicate its compliance with the provisions of this report. It has the buttons on the left flank, elasticated wrists and a mandarin collar, and is quite similar to a chef's uniform. It is designed to minimize pathogen contact with street clothes.

== Use as a school uniform ==
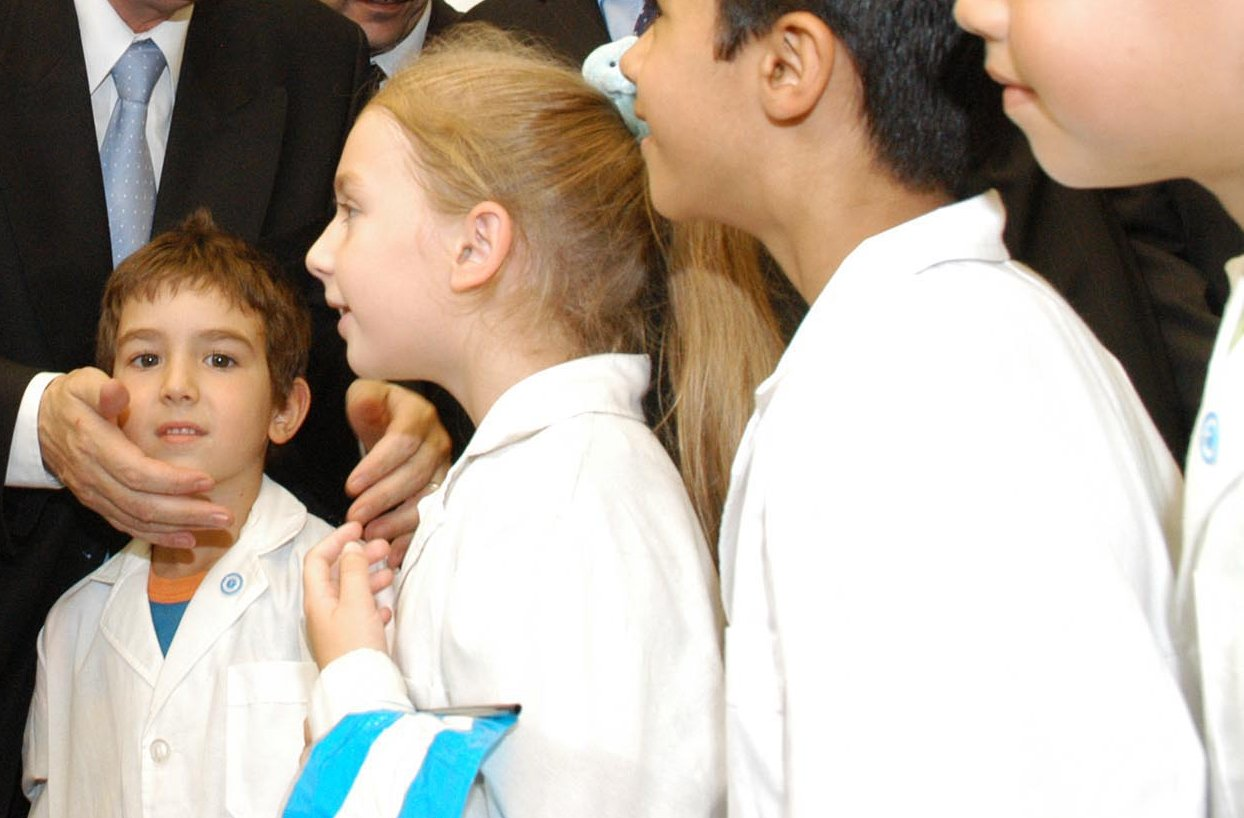
The ubiquitous white uniform of Argentine school children is a national symbol of learning.

White coats which resemble lab coats are worn by students and teachers of most public primary schools as a daily uniform in countries like Argentina, Uruguay, Spain, Bolivia and Morocco, and in private schools in Colombia. It also was formerly worn during past decades in Paraguay and Chile.

== Traditions ==
=== Coat length ===
Medical students in their first year of residency traditionally wear a shorter coat that reaches only to the hips. This is done so that medical staff can identify first-year residents at a glance, as they may need additional help from senior staff. Residents in their second year and up wear a traditional knee-length coat.

=== White versus black ===
Until the mid-1920s, students who were examining cadavers would wear black lab coats to show respect for the dead. Black lab coats were used in early biomedical and microbiology laboratories. The "whiteness" and "pureness" concepts that were established in medicine pervaded that environment at the end of the 19th and beginning of the 20th centuries and physicians changed the black for the white coat. Black coats were worn by surgeons as opposed to white until general anaesthesia became widespread in the early 1900s. Anaesthesia allowed surgeries to be performed more slowly and precisely, reducing mess and bloodiness; white coats then developed a symbolic association with a bloodless field.

=== White coat ceremony ===
A white coat ceremony is a relatively new ritual that marks one's entrance into medical school and, more recently, into a number of health-related schools and professions. It originated at University of Chicago's Pritzker School of Medicine in 1989 and involves a formal "robing" or "cloaking" in white lab coats.

== See also ==
- Scrubs – Lightweight, washable clothing worn by hospital staff or other medical personnel
