= Shilokh Mission Hospital =

Pakistani Hospital

Coordinates: 32°38′31.2″N 74°12′22.1″E

Geography
- Location: Jalalpur Jattan, Gujrat, Punjab, Pakistan

Organisation
- Care system: Private
- Affiliated university: University of Health Sciences

Services
- Beds: 250

History
- Founded: 1900s

Links
- Lists: Hospitals in Pakistan

Shilokh Mission Hospital (Urdu: شیلوخ مشن ہسپتال), formerly known as Scottish Mission Hospital, is the oldest hospital of the city Jalalpur Jattan.

== History ==
The hospital was founded by Herbert Francis Lechmere Taylor (1872-1954) in 1900s in British India. It was the first hospital of the region, which started in a tent and gradually transformed into a well known hospital.

By mid-century, the hospital's work was sufficiently prominent for senior staff to be honoured by the British Crown: in the 1966 New Year Honours the surgeon Theodore Gumming Skinner received an OBE "as medical missionary in charge of the Scottish Mission Hospital, Jalalpur Jattan, West Punjab."

At present, it has the capacity of 250 beds. The hospital is run by a christian missionary associated with the Church of Scotland. It was taken on lease by the administration of Hashmat Medical and Dental College to serve as one of its three teaching hospitals and still running by Hashmat Medical College. Anwar Rehmat is the present medical director of the hospital.
