= Homs University =

University in Homs, Syria

Coordinates: 34°42′46″N 36°42′31″E

- جَامِعَة حِمْص
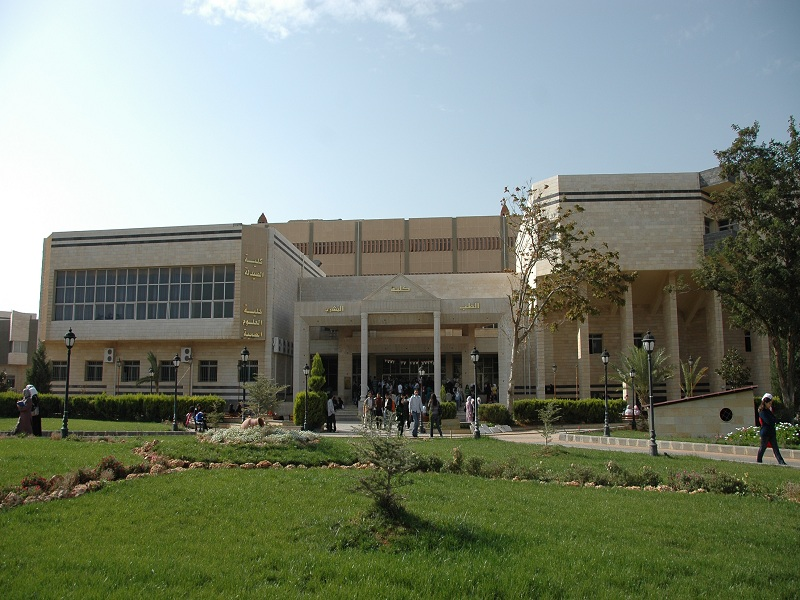
- Faculty of Medicine, Homs University.
- Motto: طريقك إلى مستقبل مشرق
- Motto in English: Your way to a bright future
- Type: Public
- Established: 14 September 1979
- Academic affiliations: UNAI; UNIMED
- President: Abdul Basit al-Khatib
- Administrative staff: 600
- Students: 12,000
- Location: Homs, Homs Governorate, Syria
- Website: homs-univ.edu.sy

Homs University (Arabic: جَامِعَة حِمْص, ALA-LC: Jāmiʻat Ḥimṣ) is a public university located in the city of Homs, Syria, 180 km north of Damascus. It is Syria's fourth largest university. During the Ba'athist era, the institution was known as Al-Baath University (Arabic: جَامِعَة الْبَعْث, ALA-LC: Jāmiʻat al-Baʻth) from its establishment in 1979 until it adopted its current name in 2024.

== History ==
The university was established in 1979 as Al-Baath University under Hafez al-Assad's Presidential Decree No. 44 during the Ba'athist era.

As of 2005 the University had 22 faculties, 5 intermediate institutes, 40,000 regular students, 20,000 students in open learning, 1310 high studies students and 622 faculty members.

As of 2025 Homs University has 10 faculties, 9 colleges, 1 school, 1 preparatory course, 4 intermediate institutes, 2 higher institutes, around 100,000 students and 1400 faculty members.

The library contains some 63,000 volumes (as of 2011).

Following the fall of the Assad regime, the university was renamed to "Homs University" by interim prime minister Mohammed al-Bashir of the Syrian caretaker government on 25 December 2024.

== Gallery ==
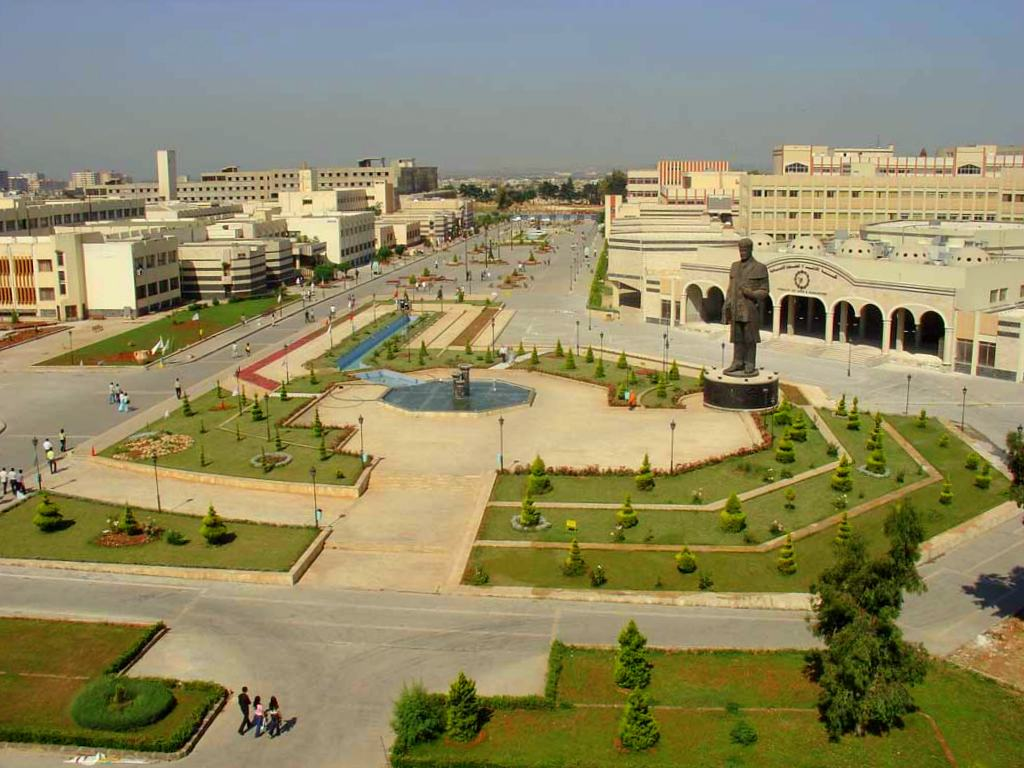
The main walkway at the university

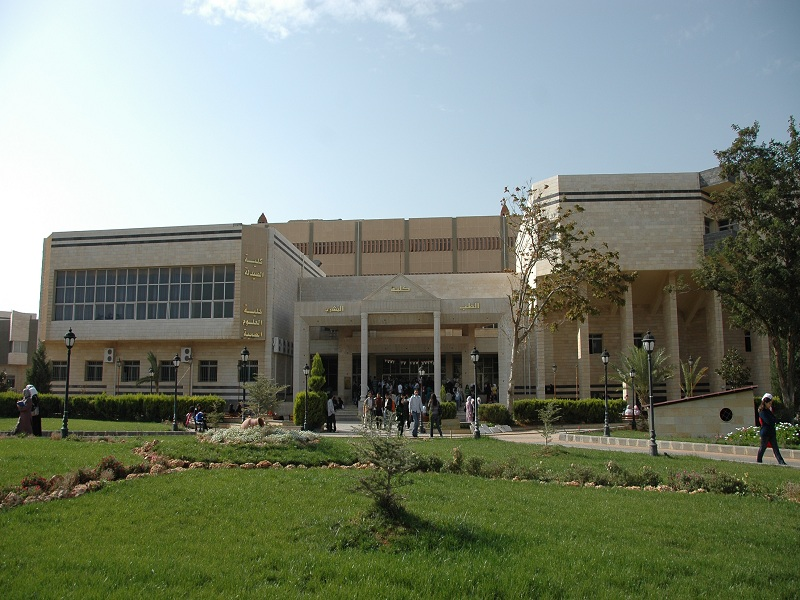
The Faculty of Medicine

== See also ==
- Faculty of Medicine of Homs University
