= International medical graduate =

Physician from an international medical school

An international medical graduate (IMG), earlier known as a foreign medical graduate (FMG), is a physician who has graduated from a medical school in a different country with subsequent human capital flight. The term non-local medical graduate may be similarly used in countries with distinct licensing regions within them. Generally, the medical school of graduation is one listed in the World Directory of Medical Schools (WDOM) as accredited by the Foundation for Advancement of International Medical Education and Research or the World Health Organization.

Medical schools around the world vary in education standards, curricula, and evaluation methods. Many countries have their own certification program, equivalent to the Educational Commission for Foreign Medical Graduates (ECFMG) in the United States. The purpose of ECFMG Certification is to assess the readiness of international medical graduates to enter clinical specialty training programs as resident physicians and fellowship programs in the United States.

== License requirements by country ==
The requirements to obtain a license to practice varies by country and often by state, province, or territory.

=== Australia ===
IMGs (or Overseas Trained Doctors) who wish to be licensed in Australia must apply to the Australian Medical Council (AMC) to arrange an appropriate assessment pathway. The standard pathway involves an IMG sitting a series of assessments, including an AMC MCQ Exam and an AMC clinical exam. The AMC MCQ Exam consists of 150 MCQs organized through computer adaptive scoring.

For AMC clinical exam, a candidate is required to pass 12 out of 16 cases: including one compulsory case in both gynecology and pediatrics.

IMGs who have passed the necessary exams and obtained AMC certification can then apply to Australian specialty training positions.

Australia is in the process of establishing a national registration process for all the doctors under the Medical Board of Australia.

In 2010 the Minister for Health and Ageing launched an Inquiry process into registration and accreditation processes for international medical graduates which reported in 2012.

=== Canada ===
In Canada, international medical graduates include all graduates from outside Canada. For IMGs to be eligible for full licensure in every Canadian province and territory, they must hold:

- A medical degree from a school listed in the World Directory of Medical Schools with a Canada Sponsor Note; OR
- A Doctor of Osteopathic Medicine degree from a U.S. school accredited by the AACOM; OR

The candidate must also:

- Be a Licentiate of the Medical Council of Canada (LMCC), which requires passing the MCCQE Part I and Part II
- Complete postgraduate training program in allopathic medicine and been evaluated by a recognized authority. For entering a residency program, the candidate must first pass the National Assessment Collaboration Examination
- Be certified by the College of Family Physicians of Canada, the Royal College of Physicians and Surgeons of Canada, or the Collège des médecins du Québec.

However, some provinces may have alternate paths to licensure, e.g. British Columbia. Alberta province, with six other provinces across Canada, has a program called Practice Ready Assessment (PRA) which enables eligible IMGs to start practice under supervision and leading to their independence where they need to fulfill certain requirements.

IMGs in Canada have a harder time getting into residency programs compared to Canadian graduates—only ten percent of IMG applicants get a position.

Several organizations have put pressure on the government such as the Association For Access to Health Care Services, Alberta International Medical Graduates Association, and Association of International Physicians and Surgeons of Ontario. However, other organizations deny there is a physician shortage that requires Canada to import more physicians.

=== United States ===
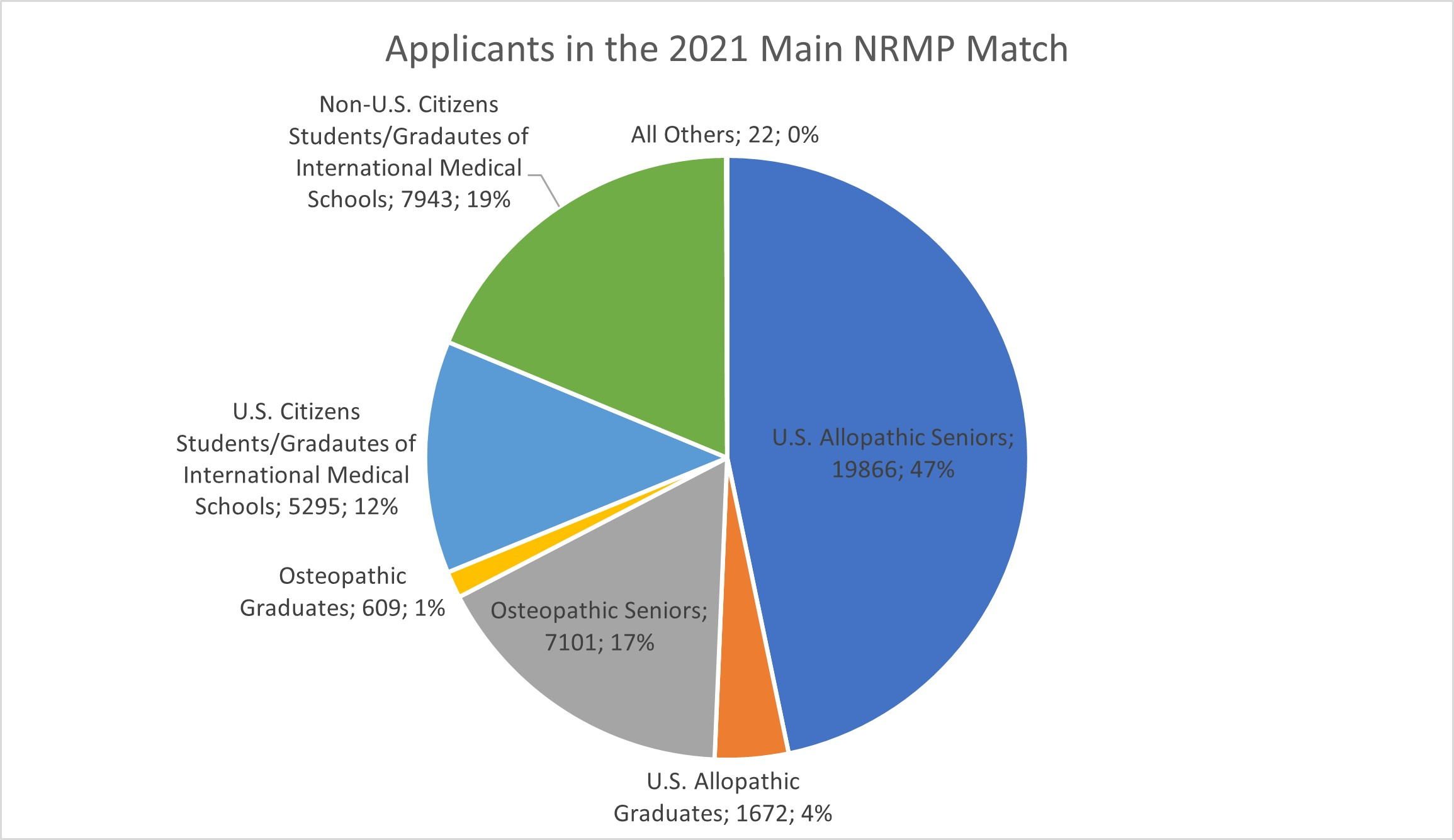

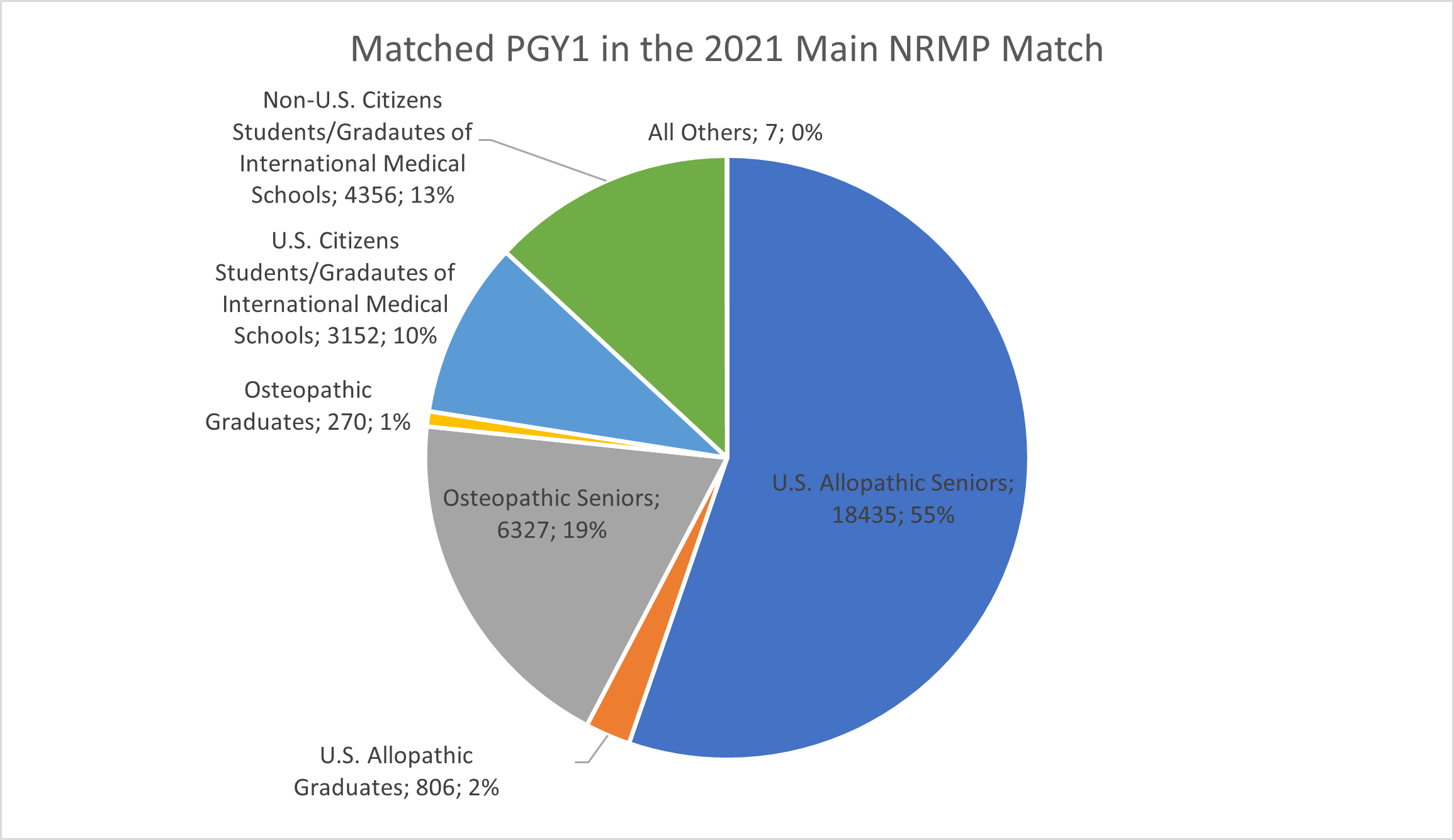

In the United States, an international medical graduate (IMG) is a graduate from a medical school located outside the United States and Canada. Graduates of Canadian M.D. programs are not considered IMGs in the United States. IMGs may be either United States citizens or non-citizens who were educated in a school outside U.S. or Canada.

==== Process ====
The main process for IMGs who wish to be licensed as physicians in the United States requires them to complete a U.S. residency hospital program. The general method to apply for residency programs is through the National Resident Matching Program (abbreviated NRMP, also called "the Match"). To participate in the NRMP match, an IMG is required to be ECFMG verified. IMGs who have not met the examination requirements for ECFMG Certification by the Rank Order List deadline "usually in February" cannot participate in the Match. However, for most IMGs it is advisable to have an ECFMG certification prior to participating in the match as many program directors decide not to grant interviews. The purpose of ECFMG Certification is to assess whether graduates of these schools are ready to enter U.S. residency and fellowship programs that are accredited by the Accreditation Council for Graduate Medical Education (ACGME). To acquire an ECFMG certification, the main requirements are:

- Completion of USMLE Step 1, USMLE Step 2 Clinical Knowledge. Previous to 2021 the USMLE Step 2 Clinical Skills was also required but has now been discontinued.
- A medical diploma of medical education taken at an institution registered in the World Directory of Medical Schools (WDOM)

In comparison, regular graduates from medical schools in the United States and Canada need to complete USMLE Steps 1 and 2 as well, but can participate in the NRMP while still doing their final year of medical school before acquiring their medical diplomas. In effect, taking regular administrative delays into account, and with residency programs starting around July, there is a gap of at least half a year for IMGs between graduation from medical school and beginning of a residency program.

Those IMGs who have passed the necessary USMLE exams, obtained the ECFMG certification and matched to a residency position can then begin training in a residency program.

USMLE exam scores are considered in the matching process for entering a residency program. One study came to the result that almost half of IMGs were unsuccessful in their first attempts in the pursuit of a U.S. residency position, and three-quarters began a residency after five years. It also indicated that IMGs were considerably older when they first applied for a residency position than are most U.S. medical graduates, with mean age of IMGs when the ECFMG certificate was issued being 32.4 years, with a standard deviation of 5.8 years.

Applicants to residency programs in California previously needed a Postgraduate Training Authorization Letter (PTAL), colloquially called a "California Letter". PTAL was discontinued by the California Medical Board in 2020. Applicants now need a post-graduate training license similar to the one issued by other states.

Concerning visa requirements, non-U.S.-citizen doctors usually enter via the J1 or the H-1B visa. The J1 requires a 2-year home residence after completion of training in the U.S. The H-1B visa does not have this 2-year home residence requirement, but further requires the USMLE Step 3. And initially, a B-1 visitor visa is required for taking the USMLE Step 2 clinical skills examination and the USMLE Step 3.

Indian physicians with an MBBS are qualified to take the USMLE. However, since the 2010s, the process of obtaining a license has become increasingly complicated. India has exported more physicians to the United States than any other foreign nation.

While the central tenets of obtaining licensure (USMLEs and ECFMG certification) are generally uniform across the country, there is a growing number of states, at least 17 as of October 2025, that have legislated various changes to parts of their state medical licensure requirements for IMGs. These alternative pathways are recommended to incorporate thorough supervision and evaluation during a provisional licensing period by board-certified, fully licensed physicians in the same specialty as the IMG. Key competence areas assessed while IMGs hold provisional licenses include patient care, medical knowledge, practice-based learning, interpersonal and communication skills, professionalism, and systems-based practice. These changes to the licensure process are often aimed at addressing physician shortages, and improving access to care.

==== Origin by country ====
The largest number of licensed International Medical Graduates comes from schools in India, the Caribbean, Pakistan and the Philippines. Medical graduates from schools in the Caribbean have had the largest growth in the period between 2010 and 2018. Their numbers have increased from 22,820 to 40,689 physicians, or 78%.

The Caribbean is home to a number of medical schools that contribute significantly to this growth, including Texila American University (Guyana and Zambia campuses), St. George’s University, Ross University School of Medicine, American University of Antigua, and American University of the Caribbean.

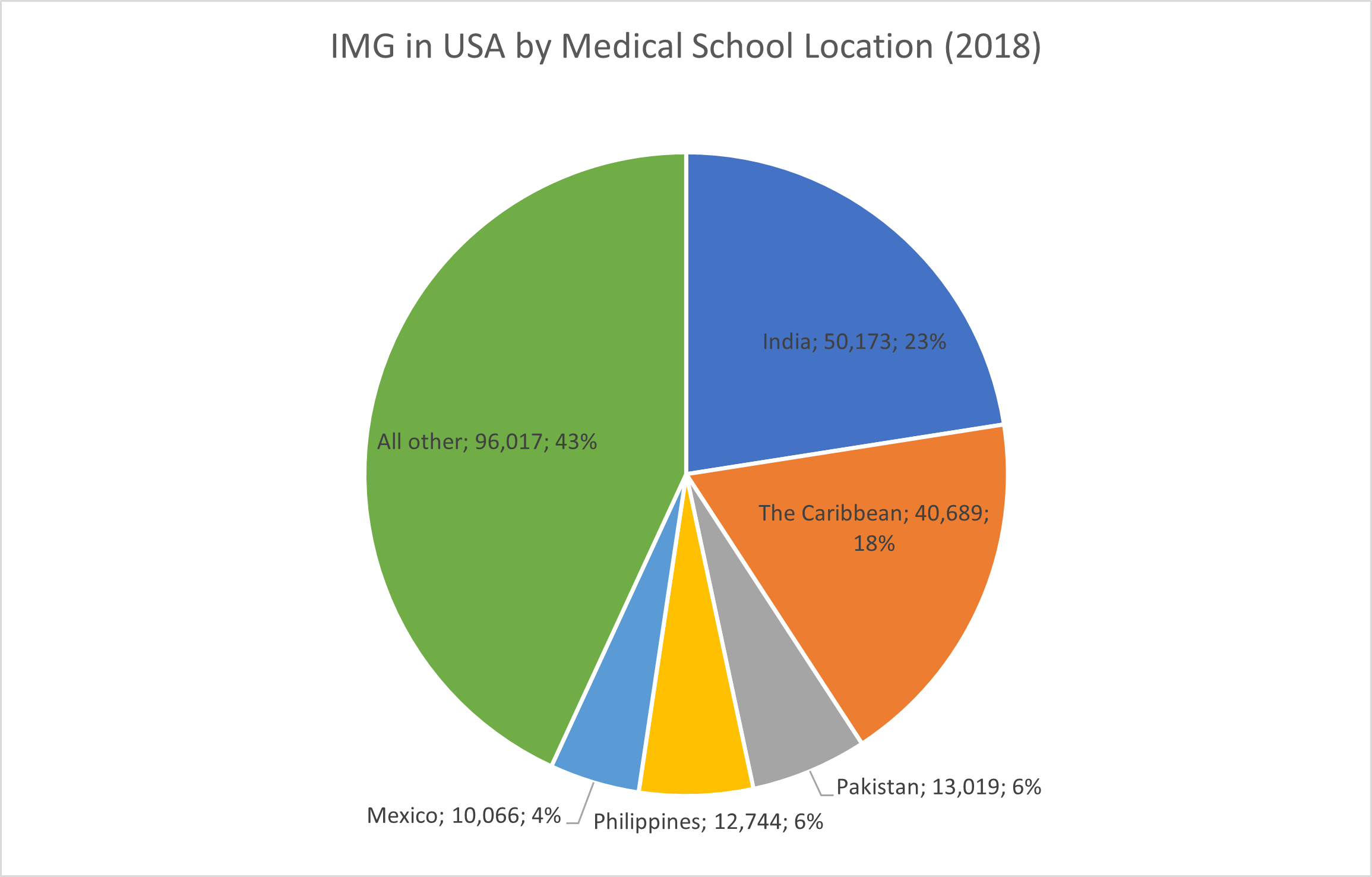

International medical graduates in the US by country of origin
Country of medical school	Percentage of IMGs	Total number (2018)
India	23%	50,173
The Caribbean	18%	40,689
Pakistan	6%	13,019
Philippines	6%	12,744
Mexico	5%	10,066
All other	42%	96,017

== Quality of care ==
One study examining quality of care by international medical graduates is noted as follows. "One-quarter of practicing physicians in the United States are graduates of international medical schools. The quality of care provided by doctors educated abroad has been the subject of ongoing concern. Our analysis of 244,153 hospitalizations in Pennsylvania found that patients of doctors who graduated from international medical schools and were not U.S. citizens at the time they entered medical school had significantly lower mortality rates than patients cared for by doctors who graduated from U.S. medical schools or who were U.S. citizens and received their degrees abroad. The patient population consisted of those with congestive heart failure or acute myocardial infarction. We found no significant mortality difference when comparing all international medical graduates with all U.S. medical school graduates". Data on older Medicare patients admitted to hospital in the US showed that patients treated by international graduates had lower mortality than patients cared for by US graduates.

== Alternative career pathways ==
Due to difficulties in becoming licensed physician in their newly adopted countries, many IMGs end up taking survival jobs not related to their medical educational and training backgrounds. These highly skilled immigrant health professionals have become a symbol of the deskilling of highly skilled migrants in this era of global migration. Against this backdrop, alternative careers where IMGs' health-related knowledge, skills, and experience can be used, have the prospect to facilitate better job market integration for IMGs.
