= Foundation for Advancement of International Medical Education and Research =

Organization

The Foundation for Advancement of International Medical Education and Research (FAIMER) is a nonprofit organization whose mission is to "support the Educational Commission for Foreign Medical Graduates (ECFMG) as it promotes international health professions education through programmatic and research activities." These activities include:

- "Creating Educational Opportunities for Health Professions Educators that support the exchange of educational expertise, acquisition of new methodologies in teaching and assessment, and pursuit of advanced degrees in health professions education.
- Discovering Patterns and Disseminating Knowledge about the relationship between health professions education and health care, and the impact of physician workforce and migration issues on the functioning of health care systems.
- Developing Data Resources to develop and maintain accurate, publicly available information that promotes an understanding of the world's health professions education systems today, and how they should look tomorrow."

One of the data resources developed by FAIMER was the International Medical Education Directory (IMED), a free web-based listing of medical schools recognized by the appropriate government agencies in the countries where the medical schools are located. The directory is now discontinued and has been replaced by the World Directory of Medical Schools

== History ==
FAIMER was established in 2000 by the Educational Commission for Foreign Medical Graduates (ECFMG). FAIMER launched the International Medical Education Directory (IMED) in 2002. In 2004, two new directories were approved: the Directory of Organizations that Recognize/Accredit Medical Schools (DORA) and the Postgraduate Medical Education (PME) Project. In 2014, FAIMER and the World Federation for Medical Education (WFME) announced the launch of the World Directory of Medical Schools by merging the organizations' respective directories: FAIMER's International Medical Education Directory (IMED) and WFME's Avicenna Directory for medicine, which is used by the ECFMG to determine eligibility of international medical graduates for the USMLE examinations and ECFMG certification.
