= World Directory of Medical Schools =

International database on medical education

The World Directory of Medical Schools is a public database of institutions that provide medical education. There are over 4,500 medical schools listed in the directory. The directory is published as a collaboration of the World Federation for Medical Education (WFME) and the Foundation for Advancement of International Medical Education and Research (FAIMER).

== Database ==
For the database, a "medical school" is defined as an "educational institution that provides a complete or full program of instruction leading to basic medical qualification; that is, a qualification that permits the holder to obtain a license to practice as a medical doctor or physician". As of 2026, the database has records for more than 4,500 medical schools that are operational and more than 190 that have ceased to be operational.

It was created by merging WMFE's AVICENNA Directory for Medicine with FAIMER's International Medical Education Directory (IMED) to produce a single comprehensive resource, including the schools in each of the prior directories.

== History ==
The World Health Organization (WHO) originally published the World Directory of Medical Schools from 1953 to 2007 before transferring responsibility to the World Federation for Medical Education (WFME), which renamed it the AVICENNA Directory for Medicine. A separate International Medical Education Directory (IMED) was published by the Foundation for Advancement of International Medical Education and Research (FAIMER) since 2002. In March 2012, the AVICENNA and IMED directories agreed to merge into a single comprehensive directory. The new World Directory of Medical Schools officially launched in April 2014, managed by both WFME and FAIMER. The AVICENNA and IMED directories were subsequently discontinued.

== Sponsors ==
The major sponsors are the Australian Medical Council, the US Educational Commission for Foreign Medical Graduates, and the Medical Council of Canada.
