= International Medical Education Directory =

The International Medical Education Directory (IMED) was a public database of worldwide medical schools. The IMED was published as a joint collaboration of the Educational Commission for Foreign Medical Graduates (ECFMG) and the Foundation for Advancement of International Medical Education and Research (FAIMER).

The information available in IMED was derived from data collected by the Educational Commission for Foreign Medical Graduates (ECFMG) throughout its history of evaluating the medical education credentials of international medical graduates. Using these data as a starting point, Foundation for Advancement of International Medical Education and Research (FAIMER) began developing IMED in 2001 and made it publicly available in April 2002.

In April 2014, IMED was merged with the Avicenna Directory to create the World Directory of Medical Schools. The World Directory is now the definitive list of medical schools in the world, as IMED and Avicenna were discontinued in 2015.

== See also ==
- List of medical schools
- AVICENNA Directory for medicine
- World Directory of Medical Schools
