= Avicenna Directories =

Former database of schools of public health and educational institutions

The Avicenna Directory project was a public database of worldwide medical schools, schools of pharmacy, schools of public health and educational institutions of other academic health professions. The Avicenna Directory was maintained by the University of Copenhagen in collaboration with the World Health Organization (WHO) and the World Federation for Medical Education (WFME) in the years 2008-2015.

In 2013, the Avicenna Directory was merged with the International Medical Education Directory (IMED) to create the World Directory of Medical Schools. This new directory was launched in April 2014.

The project was named after Avicenna, a Muslim Persian physician and philosopher born near Bukhara in the 10th century.

== AVICENNA Directory for medicine ==
The AVICENNA Directory for medicine was a public database of worldwide medical schools. It replaced the WHO World Directory of Medical Schools in 2008.

=== History ===
The WHO published the World Directory of Medical Schools from 1953–2007. The seventh and final print edition of the directory was published in 2000 and listed around 1700 schools in 162 countries. Between 2000-2007, the WHO published the directory electronically, along with updates received after the 2000 print publication. In August 2007, the WHO signed an agreement with the University of Copenhagen to transfer responsibility for development and maintenance of the directory. In March 2008, the AVICENNA project was announced and in August 2008, the contents of the World Directory of Medical Schools were transferred to the AVICENNA Directory for medicine.

In 2013, the AVICENNA Directories merged with the International Medical Education Directory (IMED) to create the World Directory of Medical Schools.

== Purpose ==
The Avicenna Directory included contact details, admission rules, program descriptions, titles of degrees and diplomas awarded, and accreditation status of institutions.

== Collaborating organizations ==
The Avicenna Directories are maintained and primarily developed at the University of Copenhagen. Collaborating organizations on the project include:

- World Health Organization
- World Federation for Medical Education
- International Pharmaceutical Federation
- World Federation of Public Health Associations
- Foundation for Advancement of International Medical Education and Research
- International Association of Medical Regulatory Authorities
- United Nations Educational, Scientific and Cultural Organization
