= Educational Commission for Foreign Medical Graduates =

US government agency

- Formation: 1956; 70 years ago
- Type: Nonprofit
- Headquarters: Philadelphia, Pennsylvania, U.S.
- Website: www.ecfmg.org

According to the US Department of Education, the Educational Commission for Foreign Medical Graduates (ECFMG) is "the authorized credential evaluation and guidance agency for non-U.S. physicians and graduates of non-U.S. medical schools who seek to practice in the United States or apply for a U.S. medical residency program. It provides comprehensive information and resources on licensure, the U.S. Medical Licensure Examination (USMLE), residencies, and recognition."

Through its program of certification, the ECFMG assesses the readiness of international medical graduates to enter residency or fellowship programs in the United States that are accredited by the Accreditation Council for Graduate Medical Education (ACGME).

ECFMG acts as the registration and score-reporting agency for the USMLE for foreign medical students/ graduates, or in short, it acts as the designated Dean's office for International Medical Graduates (IMGs) in contrast to the American Medical Graduates (AMGs).

Previously, medical schools in Canada that award the M.D. were not assessed by ECFMG because the Liaison Committee on Medical Education historically accredited M.D.-granting institutions in both the U.S. and Canada. As of July 1, 2025, Canadian medical graduates became designated as IMGs and now require ECFMG certification.

== History ==
ECFMG was founded in 1956, in response to the increase need for the evaluation of the readiness of international medical graduates entering the physician workforce during the 1950 expansion of US healthcare system. Its initial name was Evaluation Service for Foreign Medical Graduates (ESFMG). Later that year, it was renamed Educational Council for Foreign Medical Graduates. In conjunction with NBME, it created what became known as the ECFMG certification which included examinations and assessments of English language proficiency. In 1974, it merged with the Commission on Foreign Medical Graduates and changed its name to its current name Educational Commission for Foreign Medical Graduates.

== Certification ==
The main pathway for international medical graduates who wish to be licensed as a physician in the United States is to complete a U.S. residency hospital program. The general method to apply for residency programs is through the National Resident Matching Program (abbreviated NRMP, but also called "the Match"). To participate in the NRMP, an IMG is required to have an ECFMG certification by the "rank order list certification deadline" time (usually in February of the year of the match).

To acquire an ECFMG certification, the candidate must meet these requirements:

- Examination Requirement: Completion of USMLE Step 1 and USMLE Step 2 Clinical Knowledge
- Meet the clinical and communication skills requirements (see section)
- Medical education credential requirements: A medical diploma of medical education taken at an institution registered in the World Directory of Medical Schools (WDOM). The official source to confirm that a medical school meets ECFMG's requirements, is the World Directory at www.wdoms.org. Schools that meet the requirements will have an ECFMG note stating this in the schools' World Directory listing.

In comparison, regular graduates from medical schools in the United States need to complete USMLE Steps 1 and 2 as well, but can participate in the NRMP while still doing their final year of medical school before acquiring their medical diplomas. In effect, taking regular administrative delays into account, and with residency programs starting around July, there is a gap of at least half a year for IMGs between graduation from medical school and beginning of a residency program.

=== Clinical and communication skills requirements ===
The COVID-19 global pandemic has brought some changes to the ECFMG certification process. First as AAMC suspended temporarily and later eliminated the Step 2 CS examination, ECFMG moved to a pathways model for verification of clinical skills. IMGs who have already taken Step 2 CS may still use it to fulfill this requirement. All other IMGs will need:

- Assessment of communication skills, including English language proficiency through the Occupational English Test Medicine exam
- Meet the requirements for one of the pathways below:

Pathways for ECFMG certification (2022)
Pathway	Description	Notes
Pathway 1	Already Licensed to Practice Medicine in Another Country	Intended for applicants who currently hold or have recently held a license/registration to practice medicine without supervision (unless they failed Step 2 CS)
Pathway 2	Already Passed a Standardized Clinical Skills Exam for Medical Licensure	Intended for applicants who do not currently hold, or have not recently held, a license/registration to practice medicine without supervision (Pathway 1), but who successfully completed a secure, standardized clinical skills exam as a requirement for medical licensure or registration in a country other than the United States.
Pathway 3	Medical School Accredited by Agency Recognized by World Federation for Medical Education (WFME)	Intended for applicants who have not yet obtained a license/registration to practice medicine without supervision (Pathway 1) and who have not already passed an acceptable standardized clinical skills exam for medical licensure (Pathway 2). An applicant to Pathway 3, 4, or 5 must be a student or a recent graduate of a medical school that meets eligibility requirements established by ECFMG.
Pathway 4	Medical School Accredited by Agency that Has Received a Determination of Comparability by National Committee on Foreign Medical Education and Accreditation (NCFMEA)	Intended for applicants who have not yet obtained a license/registration to practice medicine without supervision (Pathway 1) and who have not already passed an acceptable standardized clinical skills exam for medical licensure (Pathway 2). These applicants must be students or recent graduates and must meet eligibility requirements established by ECFMG.
Pathway 5	Medical School Issues Degree Jointly with a U.S. Medical School Accredited by Liaison Committee on Medical Education (LCME)	Intended for applicants who have not yet obtained a license/registration to practice medicine without supervision (Pathway 1) and who have not already passed an acceptable standardized clinical skills exam for medical licensure (Pathway 2). These applicants must be students or recent graduates and must meet eligibility requirements established by ECFMG.
Pathway 6	Evaluation of Clinical Patient Encounters by Licensed Physicians	Intended for applicants who do not meet the eligibility requirements for Pathway 1, 2, 3, 4, and 5 and/or have failed Step 2 CS one or more times. To meet the requirements for Pathway 6, the applicant's clinical skills must be evaluated by licensed physicians using ECFMG's Mini-Clinical Evaluation Exercise (Mini-CEX).

=== Certification expiration ===
As of April 2021, ECFMG certifications obtained by fulfilling the clinical and communication skills requirements through a pathway will expire in 2022 if the applicant does not enter an ACGME-accredited training program in 2021 or 2022. If the applicant enters a training program they become permanent after one year of residency.

=== Projects ===
A pilot project was started in 2012 for an electronic verification system of medical credentials from international medical schools, with participation from approximately 20 international medical schools. After completion of this pilot project, ECFMG now allows all medical schools to register for free.

Expected to be implemented in late 2024, a notable development is anticipated in medical education application procedures. ECFMG Status Reports will be integrated into Electronic Residency Application Service (ERAS) submissions, offering vital information for institutions assessing applicants. These reports will specifically indicate whether the candidate's medical school meets the Recognized Accreditation Policy, determined by accreditation from agencies recognized by the World Federation for Medical Education or the National Committee on Foreign Medical Education and Accreditation. This enhancement aims to streamline the evaluation of medical school credentials, enhancing transparency and efficiency in the residency application process. However, IMGs will still be able to pursue ECFMG Certification even if their medical school doesn't meet the Recognized Accreditation Policy, as long as their school meets ECFMG's current requirements. The accrediting agencies that are WFME recognized are:

Agencies with recognition status
Agency	Country	Recognized until
Korean Institute of Medical Education and Evaluation (KIMEE)	Republic of Korea	September 2026
Accreditation Commission on Colleges of Medicine (ACCM)	Selected Caribbean countries: Anguilla, Aruba, Cayman, Islands, Curaçao, Dominica, Saint Kitts and Nevis, Sint Maarten, St. Vincent & the Grenadines, University of Jordan Faculty of Medicine - Jordan	December 2026
Japan Accreditation Council for Medical Education (JACME)	Japan	March 2027
Australian Medical Council (AMC)	Australia and New Zealand	January 2028
Independent Agency for Accreditation and Rating (IAAR)	Kazakhstan, Kyrgyz Republic, Republic of Moldova, Russian Federation, Tajikistan, Ukraine, Romania, Belarus	January 2028
Sudan Medical Council (SMC)	Sudan	June 2028
National Center for Educational Quality Enhancement (NCEQE)	Georgia	October 2028
Institute for Medical Education Accreditation (IMEAc)	Thailand	October 2028
Indonesian Accreditation Agency for Higher Education in Health (Lembaga Akreditasi Mandiri Perguruan Tinggi Kesehatan) (IAAHEH/LAM-PTKes)	Indonesia	October 2028
Accreditation Organisation of the Netherlands and Flanders (Nederlands-Vlaamse Accreditatieorganisatie) (NVAO)	Netherlands and Flanders	November 2028
Mexican Board for Accreditation of Medical Education (Consejo Mexicano para la Acreditación de la Educación Médica (COMAEM)	Mexico, Costa Rica	April 2029
National Authority for Quality Assurance and Accreditation of Education (NAQAAE)	Egypt	April 2029
System of Accreditation of Medical Schools/Sistema de Acreditação de Escolas Médicas (SAEME)	Brazil	April 2029
Taiwan Medical Accreditation Council (TMAC)	Taiwan	April 2029
Secretariat of the Council for Undergraduate Medical Education (SCUME)	Iran	June 2029
Commission for Academic Accreditation (CAA)	United Arab Emirates	June 2029
Cyprus Agency of Quality Assurance and Accreditation in Higher Education (CYQAA)	Cyprus	February 2030
Working Committee for the Accreditation of Medical Education, Ministry of Education (WCAME)	China	June 2030
Medical Council of Ireland (MCI)	Ireland, Royal College of Surgeons in Ireland, Medical University of Bahrain - Bahrain	June 2030
Accreditation and Quality Assurance Commission for Higher Education Institutions (AQACHEI)	Jordan, Iraq, Palestine, and Syria	September 2031
Quality Assurance Agency for Higher Education (AQU)	Catalonia, Spain	October 2031
Agency for Accreditation of Educational Programs and Organizations (AAEPO)	Kyrgyzstan	March 2032
Hungarian Accreditation Committee (MAB)	Hungary	March 2032
National Center for Academic Accreditations (NCAAA)	Saudi Arabia	April 2032
American Osteopathic Association, Commission on Osteopathic College Accreditation (AOA COCA)	United States of America	August 2032
Grenada Medical and Dental Council (GMDC)	Grenada	September 2032
National Agency for Quality Assessment and Accreditation of Spain (ANECA)	Spain	October 2032
Eurasian Centre for Accreditation and Quality Assurance in Higher Education and Health care (ECAQA)	Kazakhstan and Uzbekistan	October 2032
Education & Training Quality Authority (BQA)	Bahrain	November 2032
Sri Lanka Medical Council (SLMC)	Sri Lanka	March 2033
Philippine Accrediting Association of Schools, Colleges and Universities (PAASCU)	The Philippines	April 2033
Malaysian Medical Council (MMC)	Malaysia	April 2033
Caribbean Accreditation Authority for Education in Medicine and Other Health Professions (CAAM-HP)	Countries of the Caribbean Community (CARICOM), Dominican Republic	May 2033
Consejo Nacional de Acreditación (CNA)	Colombia	June 2033
The Association for Evaluation and Accreditation of Medical Education Programs (TEPDAD)	Turkey, State of Palestine, Oman, Qatar, Kuwait, Lebanon	July 2033
Committee on Accreditation of Canadian Medical Schools (in cooperation with LCME)	Canada	March 2034
Liaison Committee on Medical Education (LCME)	United States of America	August 2034

== Communication ==
International medical schools can send Medical Student Performance Evaluations (MSPEs) and medical school transcripts on behalf of their students and graduates to ECFMG through digital documents by the ECFMG Medical School Web Portal (EMSWP).
