= April 1967 =

Month of 1967

<<	April 1967					>>
Su	Mo	Tu	We	Th	Fr	Sa
						1
2	3	4	5	6	7	8
9	10	11	12	13	14	15
16	17	18	19	20	21	22
23	24	25	26	27	28	29
30

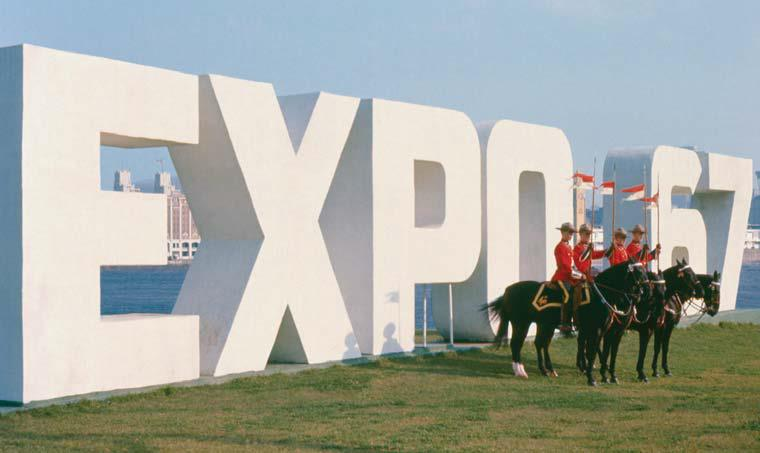
April 27, 1967: Expo '67 World's Fair opens in Montreal

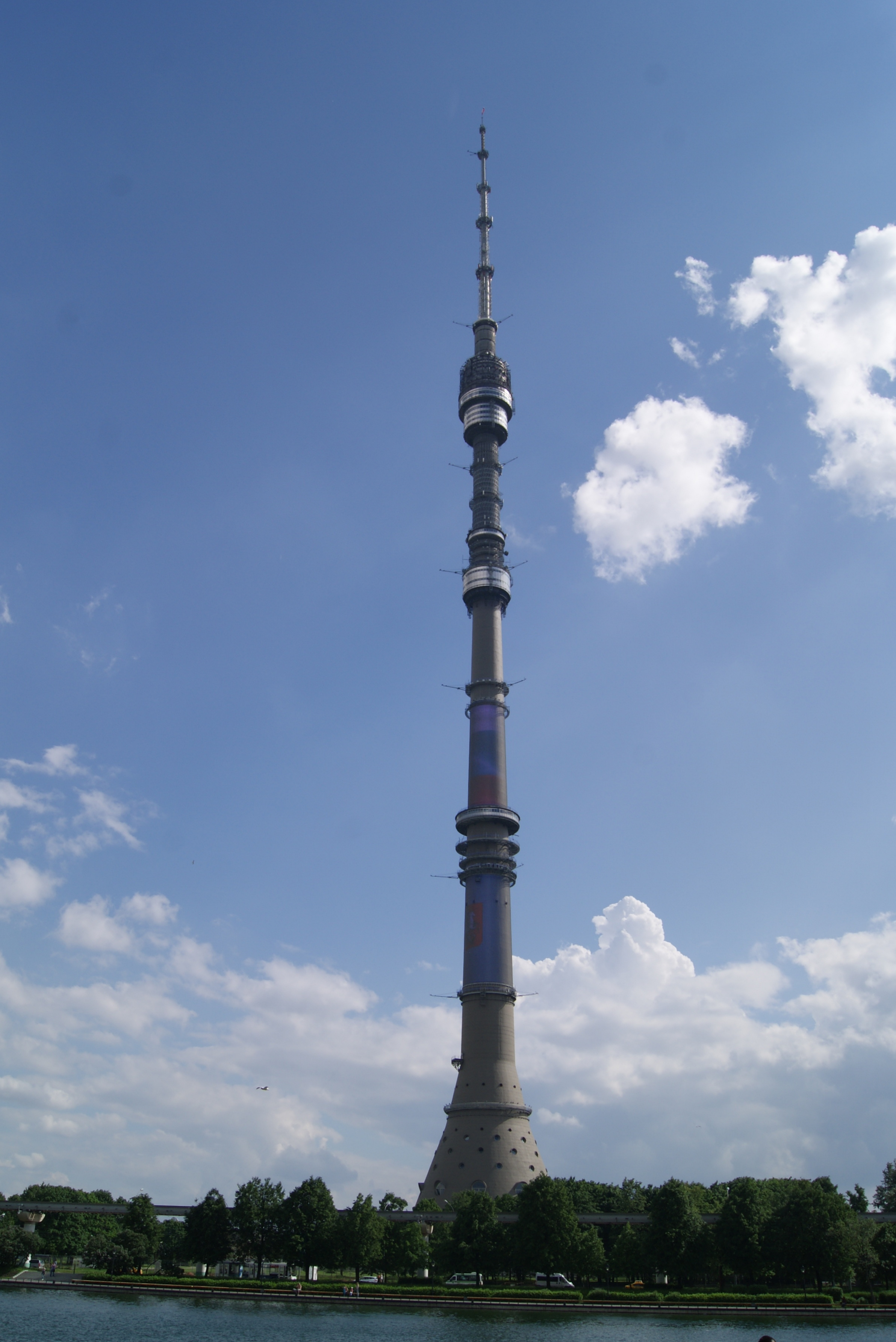
April 27, 1967: Ostankino Tower finished

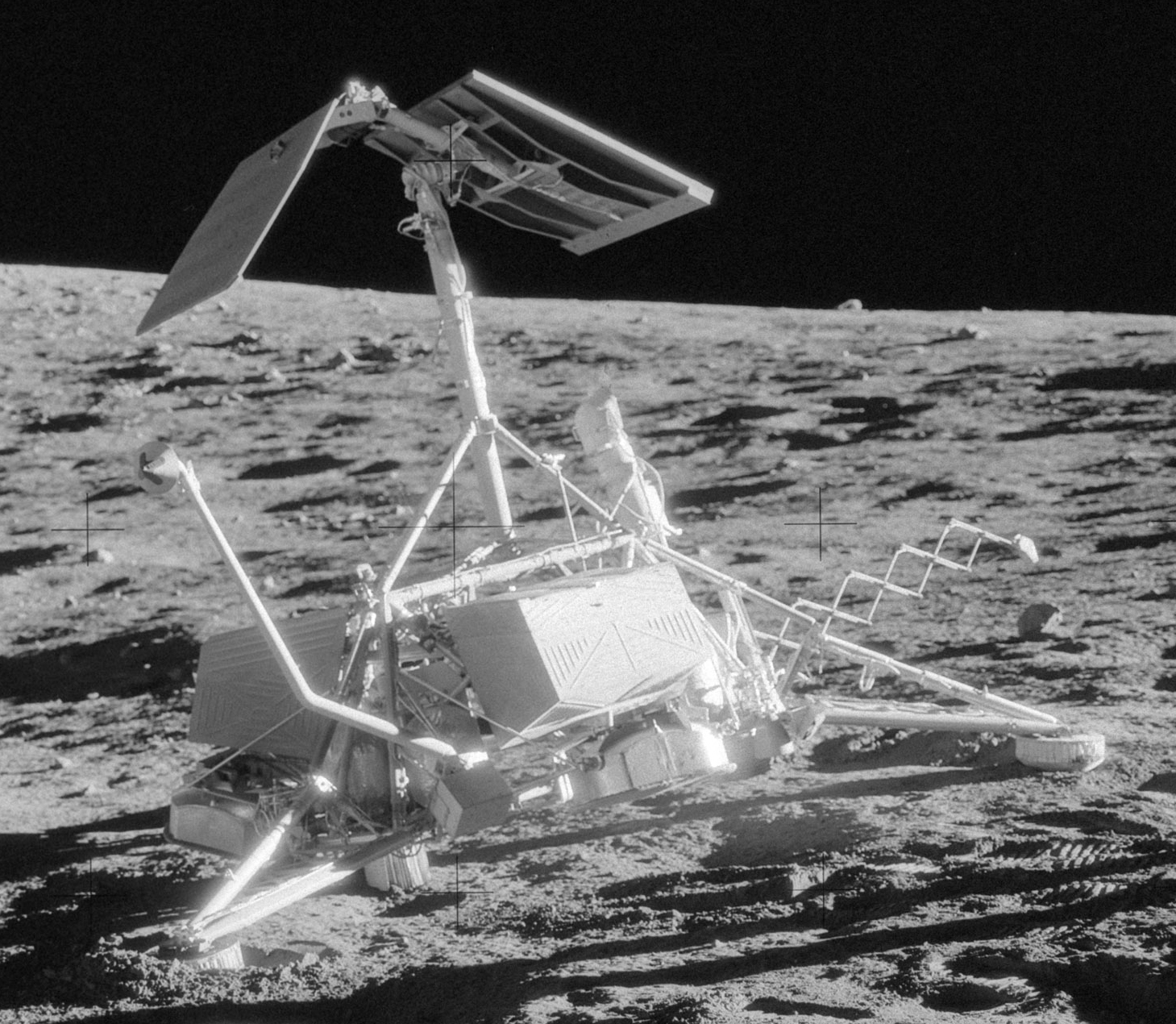
April 19, 1967: Surveyor 3 digs holes in the Moon

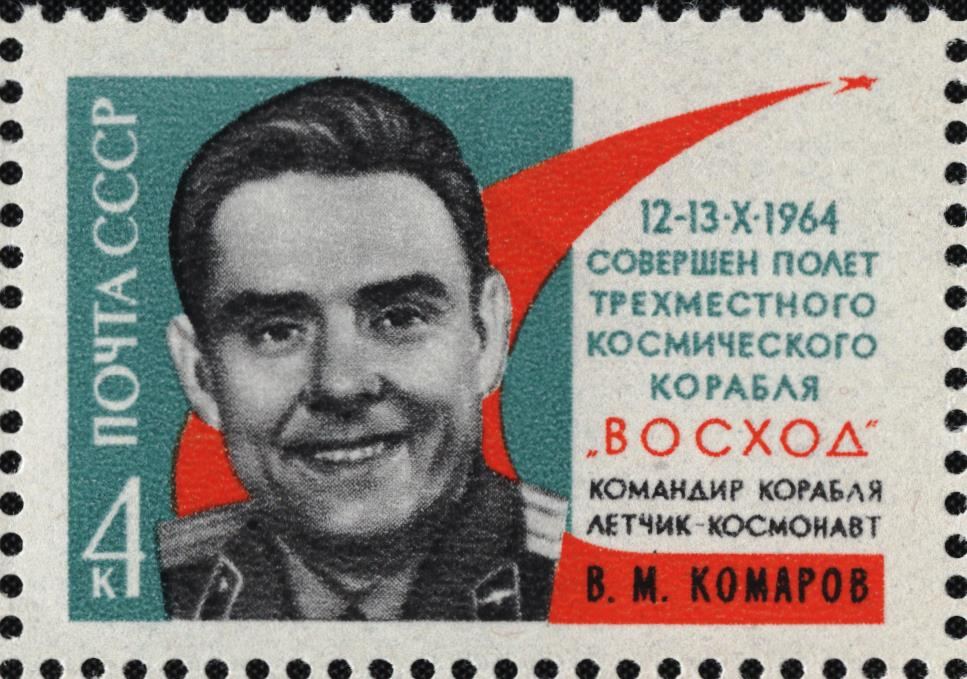
April 24, 1967: Cosmonaut Vladimir Komarov killed on Soyuz 1 mission

The following events occurred in April 1967:

== April 1, 1967 (Saturday) ==
- The Battle of Ap Gu ended after two days in South Vietnam's Tay Ninh Province, as the 1st Battalion of the 26th Infantry of the U.S. Army's 1st Infantry Division overcame an attack by the much larger 9th Viet Cong Division. The battalion commander, Lt. Colonel Alexander M. Haig, would win the Distinguished Service Cross for his heroism in flying into gunfire and defending against multiple assaults against the American encampment; Haig would rise through the ranks quickly, becoming a general two years later, and retiring as a four-star general in 1979. The U.S. Army lost 17 men, compared to 609 Viet Cong soldiers.
- Radio Zurich, a radio network in Switzerland, played an April Fool's Day joke on thousands of its listeners, by frequently interrupting regular programming with bulletins about an American crewed landing on the Moon. Telephone lines were jammed, hundreds of people traveled out to the countryside to watch for the re-entry of the mission, and even the American consulate in Zürich called the UPI news bureau in an attempt to confirm the story. "Belief in the story was increased," a UPI dispatch noted, "because there are no week-end newspapers in Switzerland and television does not start broadcasting until 6 p.m."
- The United States Department of Transportation, created as a cabinet-level department separate from the U.S. Department of Commerce, began operations at 400 Seventh Street S.W. in Washington. As part of the opening day celebrations, new Transportation Secretary Alan S. Boyd arrived "in a horse-drawn omnibus" and "piloted a large yellow balloon" 20 feet (6.1 m) above the National Mall.
- French Prime Minister Georges Pompidou and his cabinet resigned in an apparent political maneuver to get a mandate of approval from the incoming National Assembly.
- In the PBA Firestone Tournament of Champions, Jack Biondolillo bowled a 300 perfect game, the first time that happened on the Pro Bowlers Tour on ABC Sports.

== April 2, 1967 (Sunday) ==
- Local elections began in 1,004 of the 2,526 villages in South Vietnam, despite threats by the Viet Cong to attack polling places. The other 1,522 villages were either not in a secured area or were under the control of Viet Cong rebels. Village elections would be held every Sunday through May 7 as the new South Vietnamese constitution took effect.
- A United Nations delegation arrived in Aden as it approached independence. They would leave five days later, after accusing British authorities of a lack of cooperation. The British would say the delegation had not contacted them in advance.
- Born: Renée Estevez, American TV and film actress, daughter of actors Janet Sheen and Martin Sheen, and younger sister of actors Emilio Estevez, Ramon Estevez and Charlie Sheen; in New York City
- Died:
  - Laura Evangelista Alvarado Cardozo, 91, Venezuelan Roman Catholic nun who was beatified in 1995; founder of the Augustinian Recollect Sisters of the Heart of Jesus.
  - Joe Cino, 45, American theatrical producer credited with creating "Off-Off-Broadway" theatre, died three days after slashing his arms and stomach with a cooking knife.Joe Cino's page on La MaMa Archives Digital Collections
  - Austin Duncan-Jones, 57, British philosopher

== April 3, 1967 (Monday) ==
- Larry O'Brien, the United States Postmaster General (and the future Commissioner of the National Basketball Association) said in a speech that the U.S. Department of the Post Office should be abolished and replaced by a nonprofit government corporation. "If we ran our telephone system the way we run the post office, the carrier pigeon business would still have a great future," O'Brien told a gathering of magazine publishers and editors. The Postal Reorganization Act would be signed in 1970 and the cabinet-level department would be replaced on July 1, 1971, by the U.S. Postal Service.
- The island kingdom of Tonga adopted a new, decimal system of currency in advance of its full independence from the United Kingdom, replacing the Tongan pound, whose value had been tied to the Australian pound (and, for its final year, worth two Australian dollars). Whereas the Tongan pound had been divisible into 20 Tongan shillings or 240 Tongan pence, the new currency, the paʻanga (T$) could be divided into 100 seniti. The pa'anga was worth 10 Tongan shillings, and its value was on a par with one Australian dollar.

== April 4, 1967 (Tuesday) ==
- By a vote estimated to be 139 to 11 in favor, the parliament of Spain amended the nation's criminal code to provide for terms of up to six years in prison for journalists who were convicted of repeatedly criticizing the government, and up to six months for publishing any news deemed to be "false reports or information dangerous for morals or good customs, or contrary to the exigencies of national defense, of the security of the state, or of the maintenance of internal public order and external peace." Journalists could also be incarcerated if they showed a lack of "due respect for institutions and individuals when criticizing political administrative action", including anything seen as an "attack" on the government of President Francisco Franco.
- In a speech titled Beyond Vietnam: A Time to Break Silence, his strongest antiwar declaration up to that time, Martin Luther King Jr. denounced U.S. involvement in Vietnam and related his own discussions with African-Americans in the past several months. "I could never again raise my voice against the violence of the oppressed in the ghettos," King said, "without first having spoken clearly to the greatest purveyor of violence in the world today, our own government." King, who would be assassinated exactly one year later, addressed a gathering at the Riverside Church in New York City.
- Johnny Carson quit his job as host of The Tonight Show, the day after the NBC network had broadcast another rerun of one of his prior shows. Carson had not performed while the AFTRA strike continued against the American TV and radio networks. During the two weeks after the AFTRA strike failed, singer Jimmy Dean and comedian Bob Newhart took over hosting duties. Carson would receive a raise and return on April 24, and continue until 1992.
- The popular Peanuts comic strip entered a new era with the introduction of a new character that would later be given the name "Woodstock". The tiny bird, who landed on Snoopy, would become the dog's sidekick, and the comic would gradually shift from the misfortunes of Charlie Brown to the adventures of dog and bird.
- Died:
  - Guy Chamberlin, 73, American football player, coach and inductee into the Pro Football Hall of Fame
  - Al Lewis, 65, American songwriter

== April 5, 1967 (Wednesday) ==
- Police in West Berlin arrested 11 people, most of them students, on accusations that they had planned to assassinate U.S. Vice President Hubert H. Humphrey during his April 6 visit. The Spassguerrilla group, dedicated to humorous protests, would be released 34 hours later, after Humphrey's departure and after a search of their apartments showed that they were harmless and that their attack on the Humphrey motorcade would consist of wheat flour, soluble paint, pies and the Vice President's favorite dessert, pudding.
- Corazon Amurao, the only eyewitness to Richard Speck's murder of eight nurses on July 13, 1966, testified in his criminal trial in Peoria, Illinois, and pointed him out as the man who had killed her roommates. Miss Amurao had seen Speck when she opened the door to the bedroom she shared with two fellow nurses, but had been able to hide under a bed during the killings.
- Piet de Jong formed a coalition government as the new Prime Minister of the Netherlands, replacing Jelle Zijlstra after the February parliamentary elections.
- Born: Anu Garg, Indian-born American writer and creator of Wordsmith.org site; in Meerut
- Died: Hermann Joseph Muller, 76, American geneticist, recipient of the 1946 Nobel Prize in Physiology or Medicine

== April 6, 1967 (Thursday) ==
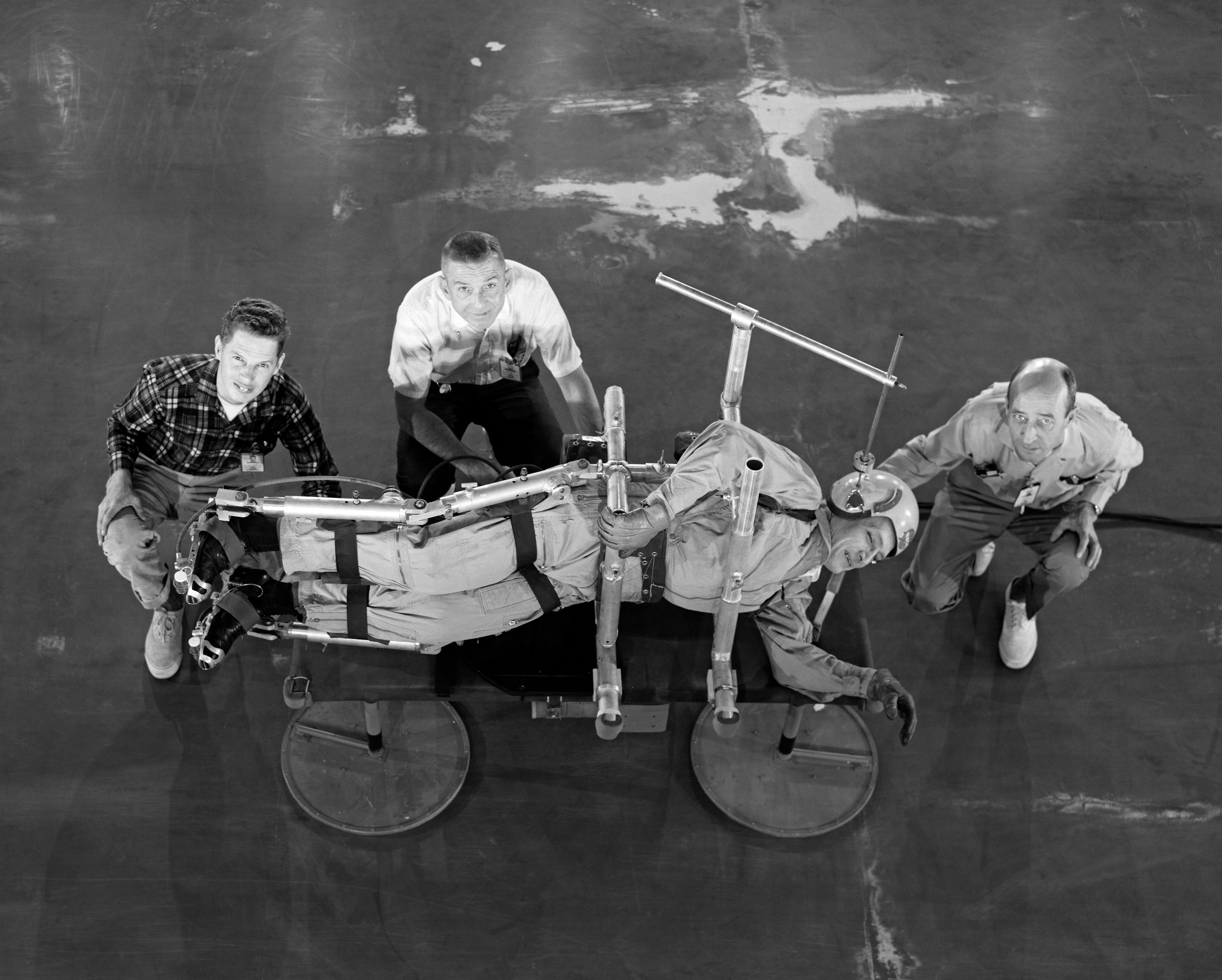
Jet Shoe test run at Langley Research Center

- Donald K. Slayton, Manned Spacecraft Center (MSC) Director of Flight Crew Operations, requested that the proposed T-020 "Jet Shoes" experiment be removed from all Apollo Applications Program (AAP) flights. The "Jet Shoes" experiment was an astronaut maneuvering system consisting of two small thrusters mounted one beneath each foot and oriented so that the thrust vectors passed close to the center of body mass with legs and feet in a comfortable position. During January, several astronauts tested an engineering development model of the "Jet Shoes" on the MSC air bearing facility. Although the tests by the astronauts were shirt-sleeve runs, a Langley Research Center (LaRC) test pilot made several runs in an inflated pressure suit. The results were unsatisfactory. In his objections to the experiment, Slayton suggested that its attempted use by an astronaut wearing a life support unit would provide extremely poor visibility.
- Bill Baird, an advocate for reform of restrictions against birth control, was arrested in front of 2,500 people at an auditorium at Boston University, shortly after announcing that he would challenge the Massachusetts state law. Baird handed a can of Emko spermicidal foam and a condom to a 19-year-old student and was taken off the stage by Boston police, who charged him with providing contraceptives to a minor, distributing medicines without a pharmacist or medical license, and "illegally exhibiting an obscene object". Baird would fight his conviction to the U.S. Supreme Court, which would, on March 22, 1972, reverse the lower courts in the case of Eisenstadt v. Baird.
- Marking the largest ransom in United States history up to that time, the president of a bank in Beverly Hills, California, paid $250,000 for the safe release of his 11-year-old son, who had been kidnapped from his home three days earlier. A few days short of three years later, Ronald Lee Miller, an investigator for the Internal Revenue Service, would be indicted for the crime before the 3-year statute of limitations expired. After his conviction, Miller would be sentenced to life imprisonment without parole. None of the ransom money would ever be found.
- "The City on the Edge of Forever", a favorite episode of fans of the TV show Star Trek, was telecast for the first time, at 8:30 p.m. Eastern time and again at 8:30 Pacific time. One newspaper summarized that night's plot as "Under the influence of drugs, Dr. McCoy plunges through a time portal and into the New York City of the 1930s."

== April 7, 1967 (Friday) ==
- A total of $420,000 in cash was stolen from the Air France cargo terminal at New York City's JFK International Airport in a robbery carried out by three associates of the Lucchese crime family of the American Mafia, with the aid of an Air France employee, Robert McMahon. Prior to the theft, McMahon had arranged for the theft, duplication and return of a key to the room where Air France stored its cash shipments. At 11:40, when the guard was on a break to get a meal, mobsters Henry Hill and Tommy DeSimone walked into the warehouse, used the duplicate key to take seven bags, each containing $60,000 in U.S. currency, loaded them into a suit case and walked back out before midnight. The robbery would not be discovered until Monday morning when an armored car arrived to pick up the cash for a delivery.
- Israeli Mirage jet fighters shot down six Syrian MiG-21s in one day, two months before the start of the Six-Day War. Earlier in the day, Syrian troops fired from the Golan Heights at a tractor being driven by a farmer from the kibbutz of Gadot, and then began firing mortar shells in and around the community. Israeli tanks took up positions and fired back, and Syrian tanks then mobilized. At 1:30 in the afternoon, Israel's Mirage fighters began bombing and strafing the Golan Heights, and at 1:45, the Syrian Air Force scrambled its MiG-21s, which were all shot down in the battle, while the Israelis suffered no losses. The first air battle began at 1:58 when a pair of Mirages fired at two MiGs that were patrolling over the Syrian capital, Damascus. Israeli pilot Iftach Spector downed both planes with the assistance of his wingman, Beni Romach.

== April 8, 1967 (Saturday) ==
- As truck drivers in the International Brotherhood of Teamsters prepared to walk out on strike, trucking companies that were affiliated with Trucking Employers' Inc. (T.E.I.) began a lockout and turned away Teamsters drivers who were reporting to work. The move affected 250,000 drivers and an estimated 65% of the nation's over-the-road freight hauling.
- Max Delvalle was sworn in as acting President of Panama, becoming "the first Jewish president in the history of the Americas". Delvalle, the primary vice president, was put in office while President Marco Aurelio Robles was in Uruguay for a conference of Latin American presidents, and served for a week until Robles returned.
- One week after he and his cabinet resigned, French Prime Minister Georges Pompidou formed "a substantially unchanged cabinet" that included opposition party members who had lost re-election to parliament, including Foreign Minister Maurice Couve de Murville and Armed Forces Minister Pierre Messmer.
- The Beagle B.121 Pup aircraft, a small airplane designed by the United Kingdom's Beagle Aircraft company, was flown for the first time. The Shoreham School of Flying would order the first models, with four Pup-100s and a Pup-150.
- The crash of a South Korean Air Force C-46 transport plane into a slum in Seoul killed 44 residents, along with all 15 people on the crashed into their homes. All 15 people on the plane died as well.
- "Puppet on a String", sung by Sandie Shaw (music and lyrics by Bill Martin and Phil Coulter), won the Eurovision Song Contest 1967 for the United Kingdom.
- The Cosmos 154 spacecraft, a variant of the Zond spacecraft, was launched into low Earth orbit. It would reenter the Earth's atmosphere on April 10, 1967.

== April 9, 1967 (Sunday) ==
- The Boeing 737 made its first flight. A pair of test pilots (Brien Wygle and Lew Wallick Jr.) guided the plane on its takeoff from Boeing Field in Seattle, flew over the Pacific Northwest for two and a half hours at speeds of up to 530 miles per hour (850 km/h), then landed at the nearby Paine Field about 20 miles (32 km) away near Everett, Washington.

== April 10, 1967 (Monday) ==
- Oral arguments began in the landmark Supreme Court of the United States case Loving v. Virginia, challenging the Commonwealth of Virginia's statutory scheme to prevent marriages between persons solely on the basis of racial classifications. Two attorneys from the American Civil Liberties Union (ACLU), Philip Hirschkop and Bernard S. Cohen, appeared on behalf of Richard Loving, a white man, and his wife Mildred Jeter Loving, an African-American woman. The Court would rule unanimously in favor of the Lovings on June 12, and interracial marriage would become legal in all of the United States.
- The AFTRA strike was settled just in time for the 39th Academy Awards ceremony to be held, hosted by Bob Hope and telecast at 10:00 p.m. on ABC.
- Academy Awards went to A Man for All Seasons for Best Picture, Best Director (Fred Zinneman), and Best Actor (Paul Scofield). Elizabeth Taylor won the Best Actress award for Who's Afraid of Virginia Woolf?.

== April 11, 1967 (Tuesday) ==
- Adam Clayton Powell Jr. won a special election to for New York State's 18th Congressional District, to fill the vacancy caused after the House of Representatives had voted in January not to seat him. Powell's constituents, located in Harlem, gave him 27,900 of the 32,418 votes cast, compared to 4,091 for his Republican Party challenger, Mrs. Lucille Pickett Williams, and only 427 for Reverend Ervin Yearling of the Conservative Party of New York. Still facing contempt of court charges, Powell would remain on the island of Bimini in the Bahamas for the rest of his term without taking his seat. After winning re-election again in 1968, he would take his seat in the House of Representatives in January 1969, but would fail to win the 1970 election.
- Walter Cronkite returned to the CBS Evening News for the first time since the start of the AFTRA strike on March 28. During his absence, Arnold Zenker, the network's manager of news programming, delivered the news, announcing each day that he was "sitting in" for Cronkite. On his return, Cronkite opened by joking, "Good evening. This is Walter Cronkite, sitting in for Arnold Zenker. It's good to be back." During the strike, ABC producer Daryl Griffin substituted for regular anchor Peter Jennings, and Chet Huntley operated without David Brinkley during NBC's nightly Huntley-Brinkley Report.
- Oil from the sunken American supertanker Torrey Canyon washed ashore on the beaches of France for the first time, along a 30-mile stretch of the shores of Brittany. Governors of coastal provinces were given authority by the national government to implement the ORSEC plan (Organisation de la Réponse de Sécurité Civile) to combat the disaster.
- All 39 persons aboard an Air Algérie DC-4 were killed when the plane crashed into a hillside near the city of Ouargla in Algeria. The DC-4 was coming in for a final approach to the airport at Tamanrasset at the end of a flight from Algiers.
- Thailand allowed American B-52 bombers to begin flying bombing missions in Vietnam.
- Died: Sir Donald Sangster, 55, the second Prime Minister of Jamaica, died less than two months after taking office. Sangster had been sworn in on February 23 and had been stricken by a cerebral hemorrhage three weeks later, on March 16, while working on the national budget. Flown to Montreal on March 21, Sangster had gone into a coma on April 1 and never awoke. Later in the day, Hugh Shearer was selected as the new leader of the Jamaican Labour Party and was sworn into office as the new Prime Minister. Shearer would serve until March 2, 1972.

== April 12, 1967 (Wednesday) ==
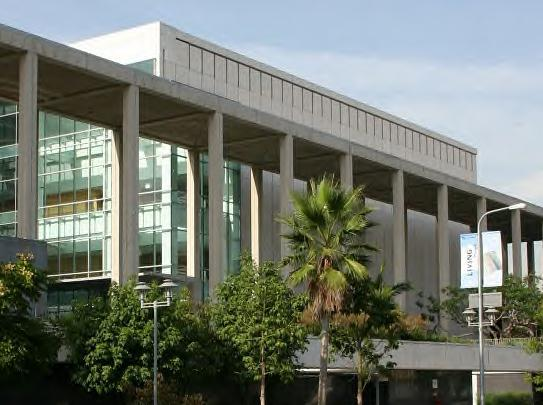
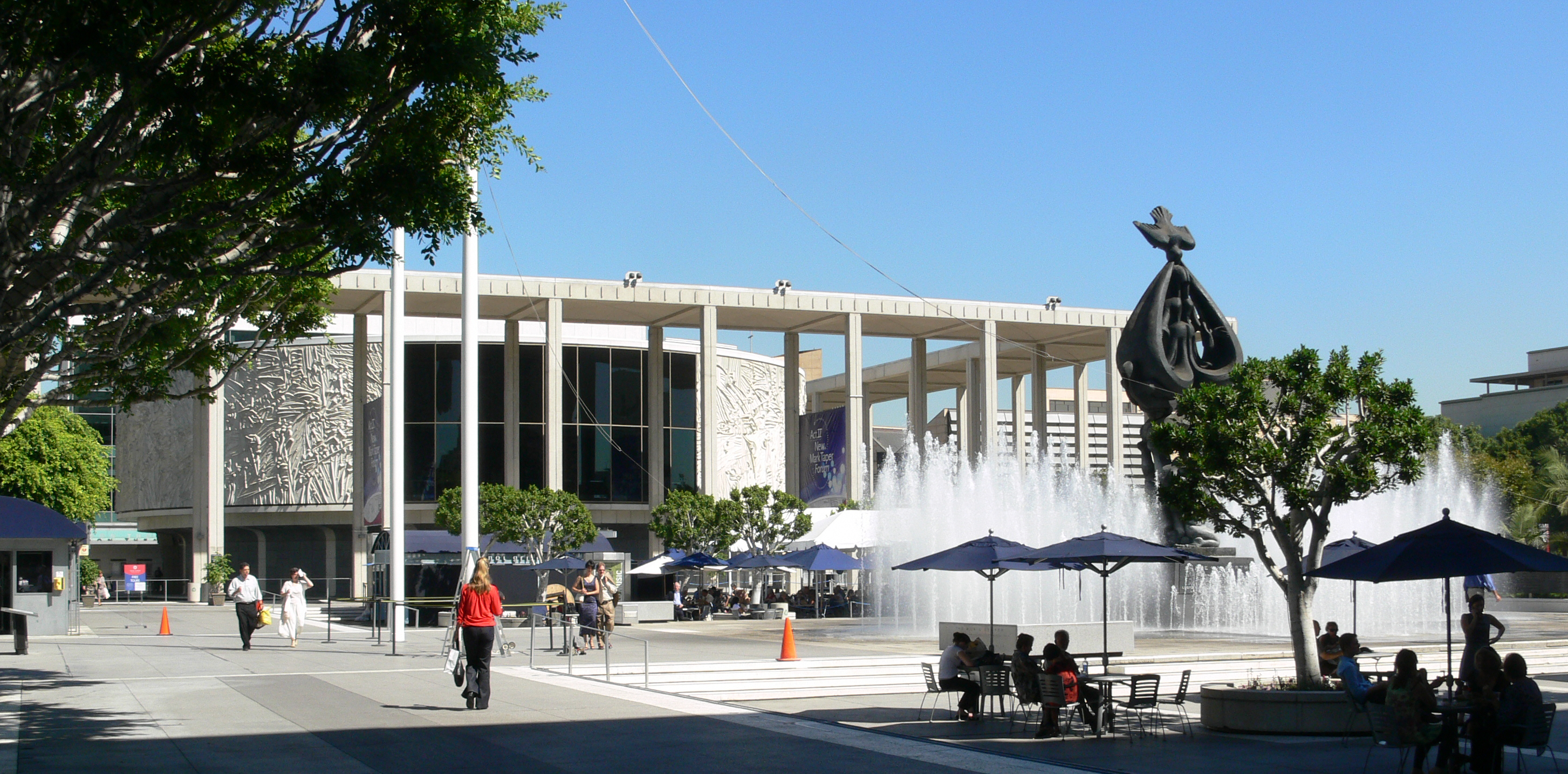
L.A. attractions Ahmanson Theatre and Mark Taper Forum
- The 2,100 seat Ahmanson Theatre opened in Los Angeles, three days after the dedication of the Mark Taper Forum, and joined the Dorothy Chandler Pavilion in completing the long-planned Los Angeles Music Center. Prior to the presentation of the first Ahmanson production, Man of La Mancha (known for the song "The Impossible Dream"), actor Gregory Peck told the audience, "Tonight marks the realization of what seemed an impossible dream. Tonight, we become a more sensible community. Since we in Los Angeles did not inherit great cultural monuments, we had to create our own."
- South Korea fired artillery shells across the Demilitarized Zone into North Korea for the first time since the 1953 Armistice halting the Korean War.
- Soviet Army Marshal Andrei Grechko became the new Soviet Defense Minister, replacing the late Rodion Malinovsky.
- Died: William "Buster" Bailey, 64, American jazz clarinetist

== April 13, 1967 (Thursday) ==
- Gary L. Scott, a science teacher at the high school in Jacksboro, Tennessee, lost his job for violating a law prohibiting the teaching of evolution. Scott was dismissed by decision of the Campbell County Board of Education one day after the Tennessee House of Representatives had voted, 58–27, to repeal the Butler Act of 1925. The action, which revived memories of the famous "Scopes Monkey Trial", would lead to the successful repeal of §498-1922 of the Tennessee Code on May 17.
- Tom Seaver, one of the great pitchers in Major League Baseball and a future Hall of Famer, made his major league debut in a 3–2 win for the New York Mets over the Pittsburgh Pirates, and would go on to become the first starting pitcher in Mets' history to finish with a winning record, and would be the National League Rookie of the Year. Seaver had debuted with the minor league Jacksonville Suns the previous year.
- Casino Royale, a comedy intended as a spoof of the first James Bond novel by Ian Fleming, held its world premiere at the Odeon Leicester Square in London, with David Niven portraying Bond. The film would then make its American debut in New York on April 28. One critic noted that "reviewers were generally unkind".
- Died: Luis Somoza Debayle, 44, President of Nicaragua from 1956 to 1963, died from a massive heart attack.

== April 14, 1967 (Friday) ==
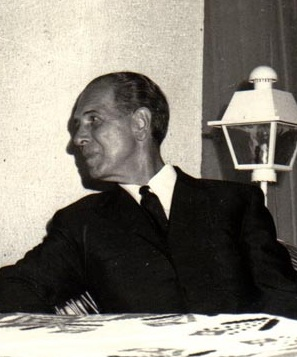
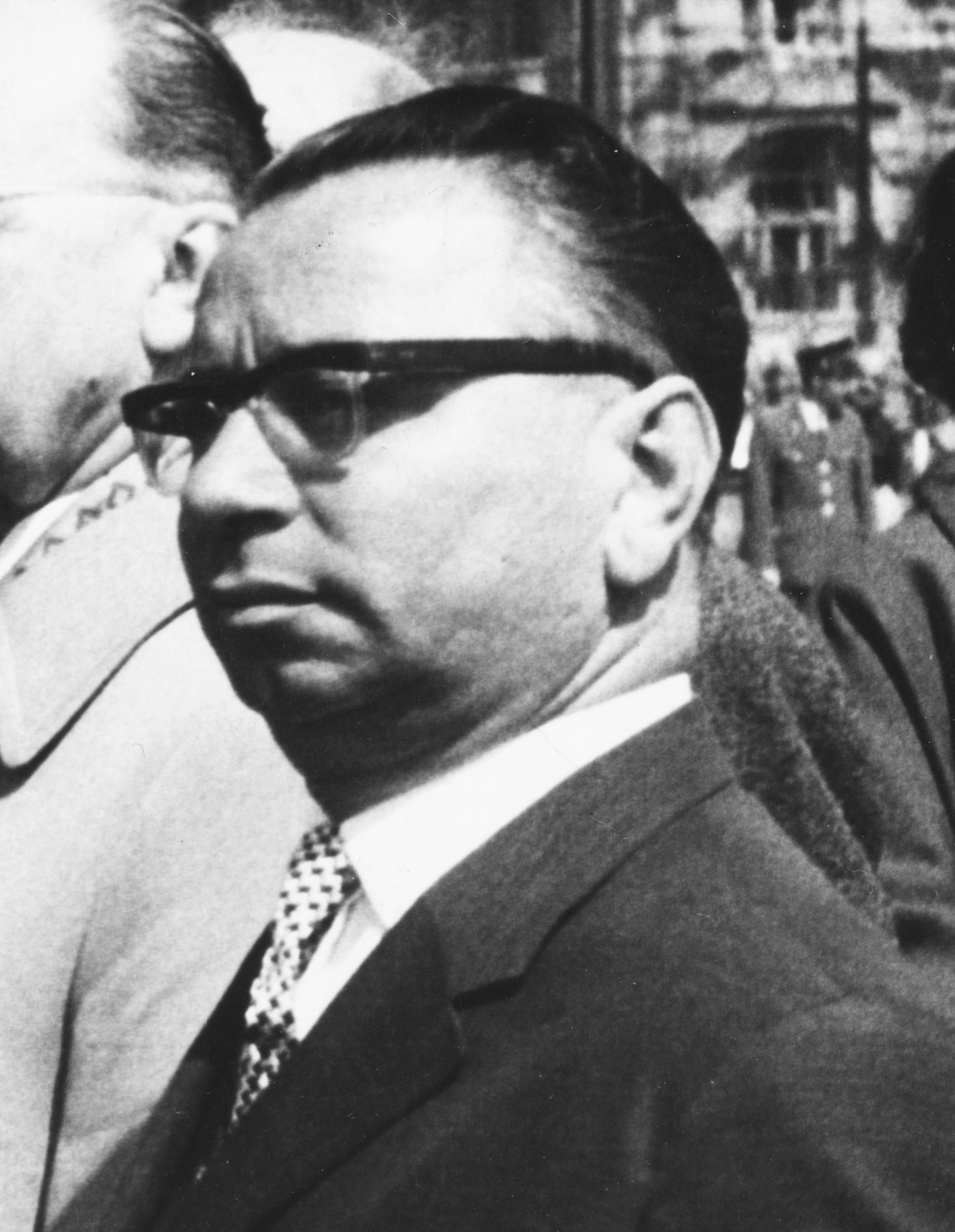
Jenő Fock replaces Gyula Kallai
- Jenő Fock became the Prime Minister of Hungary when he was named Chairman of the Council of Ministers of the Hungarian People's Republic, and would serve for eight years. Fock replaced Gyula Kállai, who became the Speaker of Parliament.
- Lieutenant Colonel Étienne Eyadema named himself President of Togo three months after leading the overthrow of President Nicolas Grunitzky. For the previous 92 days, Togo had been ruled by a "Committee of National Reconciliation", chaired by Eyadema.

== April 15, 1967 (Saturday) ==
- A group of 20 U.S. servicemen marched at the forefront of a parade from New York's Central Park to the United Nations Plaza, behind a banner "Vietnam Veterans Against the War", as part of at least 100,000 protesters in a demonstration organized by the Spring Mobilization Committee to End the War in Vietnam, marking a new development in which American vets would join the anti-war movement. Six of the veterans would form an organization of the same name after the march. What was described as "the largest peace demonstration in decades" in Manhattan lasted for four hours. Later in the day, a group called Veterans for Peace in Viet-Nam would be among 60,000 protesting the war at Kezar Stadium in San Francisco.
- When the New York marchers reached Sheep Meadow in Central Park, a group of protesters set fire to an American flag, and the Associated Press photograph ran in newspapers across the U.S., prompting the Congress to pass the first federal prohibition against flag burning.
- Elections for the Chamber of Deputies were held in the Kingdom of Jordan, with voters having a choice of 137 independent candidates for the 60 available seats. Political affiliations were banned, women were not allowed to vote, and nearly half of the winners (28 of 60) were newcomers, including Prime Minister Saad Jumaa.
- Scotland defeated England 3–2 at Wembley Stadium, with goals from Law, Lennox and McCalligog, in the British Championships. The defeat marked England's first loss since they won the World Cup and ended a 19-game unbeaten streak.
- The mistaken bombing of a contingent of South Vietnamese soldiers by two U.S. Air Force jets killed 41 troops and seriously wounded 50 others in the Binh Dinh Province.
- Born:
  - Dara Torres, American swimmer who held the world record for the women's 50-meter freestyle on three occasions, and three-time Olympic gold medalist; in Beverly Hills, California
  - Frankie Poullain, Scottish rock bassist for the band The Darkness; in Milnathort
- Died: Totò (Antonio De Curtis), 69, Italian comedian and actor

== April 16, 1967 (Sunday) ==
- The National Professional Soccer League (NPSL), the first coast-to-coast soccer league in the United States, held its opening day with five games, starting with a 2:00 p.m. game at Baltimore that was televised nationally by CBS. League Commissioner Ken Macker kicked out the first ball prior to the contest, and was accompanied by his guest, NFL Commissioner Pete Rozelle. The Baltimore Bays won, 1–0, over the Atlanta Chiefs in front of 8,434 fans. In Philadelphia, more people (14,163) turned out to see the Philadelphia Spartans (who beat the Toronto Falcons, 2–0) than baseball's Philadelphia Phillies (9,213). The rival United Soccer Association would debut a month later, on May 26.
- Professor Ryokichi Minobe of the Tokyo Education University, backed by Japan's Socialist and Communist parties, won an election to become the Governor of the Tokyo metropolitan area and its 11,000,000 people.

== April 17, 1967 (Monday) ==
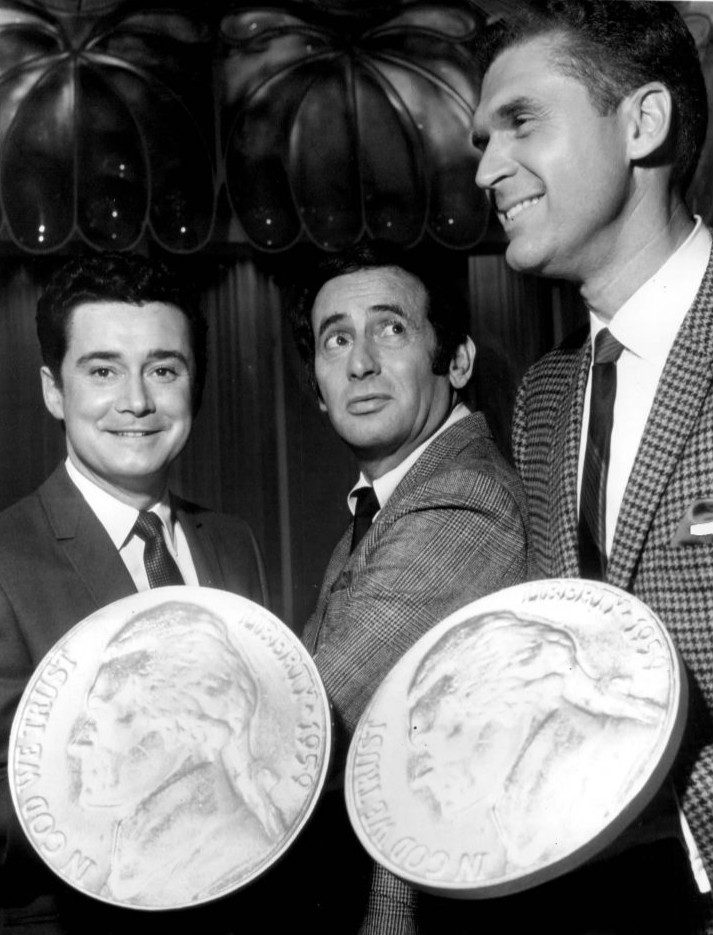
Joey Bishop (center) with Regis Philbin (left)

- The Joey Bishop Show premiered at 11:30 p.m. Eastern time on the ABC television network as a challenge to The Tonight Show and Johnny Carson. Filling the same role that Ed McMahon served on the Carson show, Regis Philbin was Bishop's announcer and sidekick. Bishop's first guest was California Governor Ronald Reagan, followed by Debbie Reynolds, Danny Thomas, and Noel Cannon ("a lady traffic court jurist").
- The last original episode of the CBS sitcom Gilligan's Island was telecast. Reruns would continue until September 4, after which it would be replaced by the first half hour of the long-running Western, Gunsmoke, which had been canceled on February 22; less than two weeks later, the decision was reversed, and the planned fourth season of Gilligan's Island was ended. Gilligan, already popular with children, would become even more popular in syndication.
- Boxer Nino Benvenuti became the World Middleweight Champion in a unanimous decision over titleholder Emile Griffith after a 15-round bout at Madison Square Garden. Griffith would win the title back in a rematch on September 29, but would then lose it back to Benvenuti on March 4.
- Congolese President Joseph Mobutu announced the creation of the "Second Republic" era of the Democratic Republic of the Congo and decreed that all political parties would be outlawed except for his own Mouvement Populaire de la Révolution (MPR).
- The United States launched the Surveyor 3 lunar probe at 2:05 in the morning in the third American attempt to make a soft landing on the moon.
- Born:
  - Kimberly Elise, African-American film and TV actress; as Kimberly Elise Trammel in Minneapolis
  - Liz Phair, American musician; in New Haven, Connecticut
  - Marquis Grissom, American baseball player; in Atlanta
  - Henry Ian Cusick, Peruvian-born British actor; in Trujillo
- Died:
  - Lt. General Emmanuel Kwasi Kotoka, 40, Ghanaian military leader and one of the leaders of the National Liberation Council that ruled Ghana, was killed in an attempted countercoup.
  - Henry James "Red" Allen Jr, 59, American jazz trumpeter, died from pancreatic cancer.

== April 18, 1967 (Tuesday) ==
- At a presentation to the Federation of American Societies for Experimental Biology, Dr. Walter Bortz II of Philadelphia's Lankenau Medical Center, Dr. Willard A. Krehl of the University of Iowa, and Dr. W. M. Bortz presented the first objective data that Americans were getting dangerously high amounts of sodium from an excess of table salt in their diets. Dr. Bortz said that most Americans were consuming more than 100 times as much salt as they needed. Dr. Krehl said that the average amount added to foods prior to sale and from the saltshaker at mealtime equated to two spoonfuls per day.
- Through the Vatican's official newspaper, L'Osservatore Romano, Pope Paul VI clarified that his March 28 encyclical Populorum progressio should not be misinterpreted as a change in the Roman Catholic Church's position against artificial birth control, despite earlier press reports. The only Church-approved contraceptive measure was abstinence.
- Jonathan Frid makes his first appearance as Vampire Barnabas Collins on the ABC-TV gothic, supernatural, time-travelling daytime soap opera Dark Shadows
- On April 18 and 19, a meeting was held at Marshall Space Flight Center (MSFC) to review the S-IVB stage for acceptability as a habitable vehicle. Personnel from MSC and MSFC attended. MSFC personnel made a presentation on the flammability testing of the liquid hydrogen tank insulation with an aluminum foil flame retardative liner.
- Born: Maria Bello, American film and TV actress; in Norristown, Pennsylvania
- Died:
  - Norwood Hanson, 42, American scientific philosopher and author of Patterns of Discovery, was killed when his private plane crashed while he was flying home.
  - Friedrich Heiler, 75, German theologian and historian

== April 19, 1967 (Wednesday) ==
- The American Surveyor 3 probe landed on the Moon at 7:04 p.m. Florida time (0004 April 20 UTC). After bouncing three times during the landing on the Oceanus Procellarum, the probe was the first to analyze the chemical composition of the lunar surface. Using a robotic scoop called the Soil Mechanics Surface Sampler, the probe dug four different trenches and sent data back to Earth, revealing that the Moon soil was "like coarse damp beach sand, being cohesive and clumpy." On May 3, the Surveyor probe would power down as it entered a two-week long "night cycle", when temperatures on the darkened surface fell to −250 °F; after the cycle's end, however, engineers on Earth would try in vain to locate Surveyor's transmitter frequency to reactivate the craft, which "apparently froze to death" and would be declared a loss upon entering its second night cycle on June 1. The bouncing would later be traced to "unexpectedly high reflectivity" from rocks on the lunar surface "at a critical point in the touchdown"; nonetheless, the spacecraft "scored history's longest hole-in-one by hopping into a crater at the end of its quarter-million mile flight."
- Kathy Switzer became the first woman to run in the Boston Marathon as a registrant, after listing herself simply as "K. V. Switzer" and being assigned the number 261. Four miles into the 26-mile event, race official Jock Semple tried to pull Switzer out of the crowd of runners, and was shoved to the curb by Switzer's boyfriend, Thomas Miller. Photographs taken by Associated Press photographer Donald L. Robinson would appear in papers around the world the next day. Switzer was not the first person to sneak into the all-male race, and had been preceded in 1966 by Roberta Gibb who jumped in from the crowd at the 26-mile event's start, but she was the first to apply for entry. Switzer would finish the race in 4 hours, 20 minutes, while Gibb, running again without registration, would cross the line after 3 hours, 27 minutes and 17 seconds. Dave McKenzie of New Zealand would win the race in a time of 2:15:45.
- Died:
  - Konrad Adenauer, 91, the first Chancellor of West Germany from 1949 to 1963, died at his home in Rhöndorf, near Bonn, a week after he had contracted influenza. Leaders from across the Western world made plans to attend his April 25 funeral.
  - William Boyle, 93, British Royal Navy officer and peer

== April 20, 1967 (Thursday) ==
- The crash of a Swiss airliner killed 126 people, most of them West German and Swiss tourists, while it was making its approach to land at the airport at Nicosia in Cyprus. Operated by Globe Air, a Bristol Britannia turboprop, struck a hillside while making a second attempt to land during a thunderstorm. The flight had originated in Thailand at Bangkok and was making multiple stops with a final destination of Basel in Switzerland. Only three passengers and one crewmember survived.
- Born:
  - Raymond van Barneveld, Netherlands professional darts player and five time World Darts Champion; in The Hague
  - Lara Jill Miller, American actress and former child star; in Allentown, Pennsylvania
  - Mike Portnoy, American drummer; in Long Beach, New York

== April 21, 1967 (Friday) ==
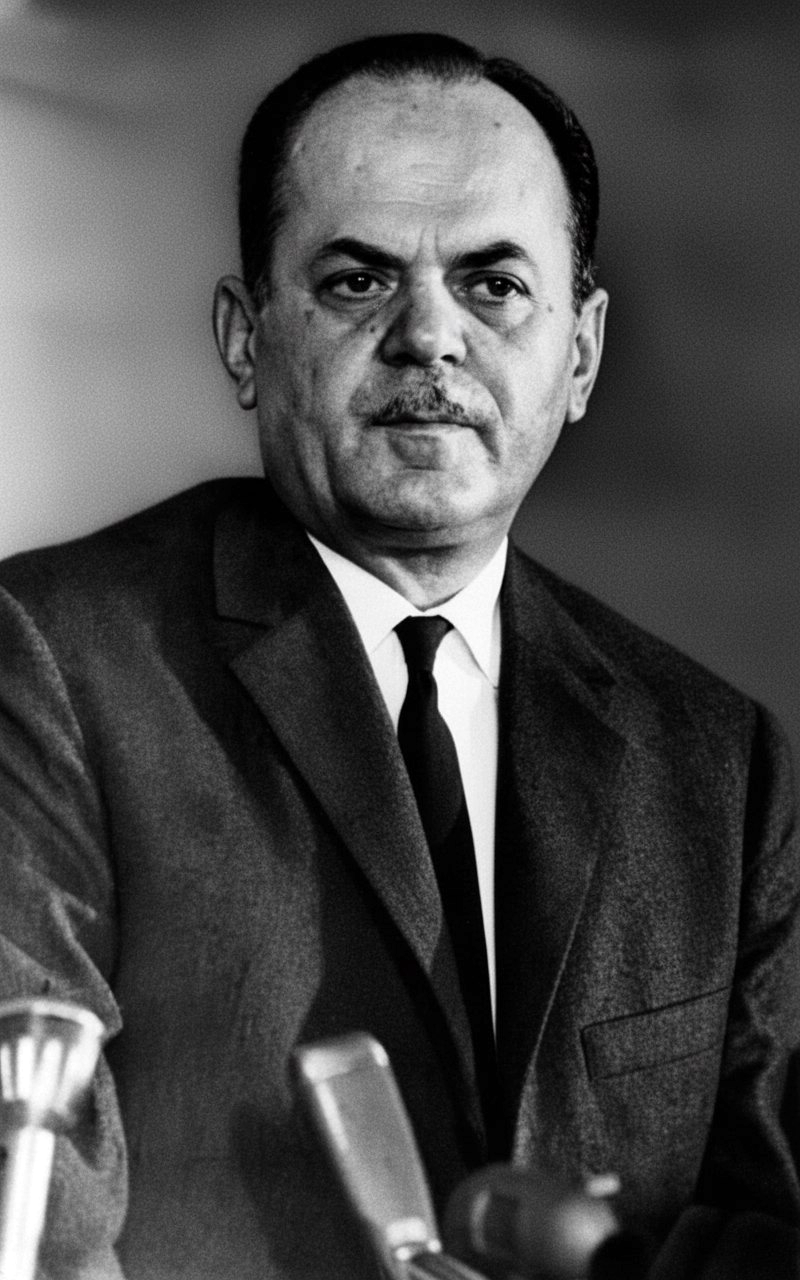
Colonel Papadopoulos

- At 2:00 in the morning local time, Greece was taken over by a military dictatorship led by Colonel George Papadopoulos, Colonel Nikolaos Makarezos, and Brigadier General Stylianos Pattakos with no opposition from King Constantine II or Prime Minister Panagiotis Kanellopoulos. The plotters had followed "Plan Prometheus", a set of instructions created by NATO for response to the threat of a Communist takeover of the royal government. Former Prime Minister George Papandreou, who had opposed the King, was arrested at the age of 79. Konstantinos Kollias was sworn in as Prime Minister the next day. The dictatorship would finally end in 1974.
- An outbreak of tornadoes struck the upper Midwest section of the United States, killing 59 people and injuring hundreds more, mostly in the Chicago suburbs of Oak Lawn (where 31 people were killed) and Belvidere, Illinois (where 21 died).

== April 22, 1967 (Saturday) ==
- The Big Mac, signature sandwich for the McDonald's hamburger restaurant chain, was introduced at a franchise owned by Jim Delligatti, and located in Uniontown, Pennsylvania, selling for US$0.45 (equivalent to $4.35 in 2025) at the Uniontown Shopping Center. The Big Mac would then be introduced to all other McDonald's restaurants in 1968.

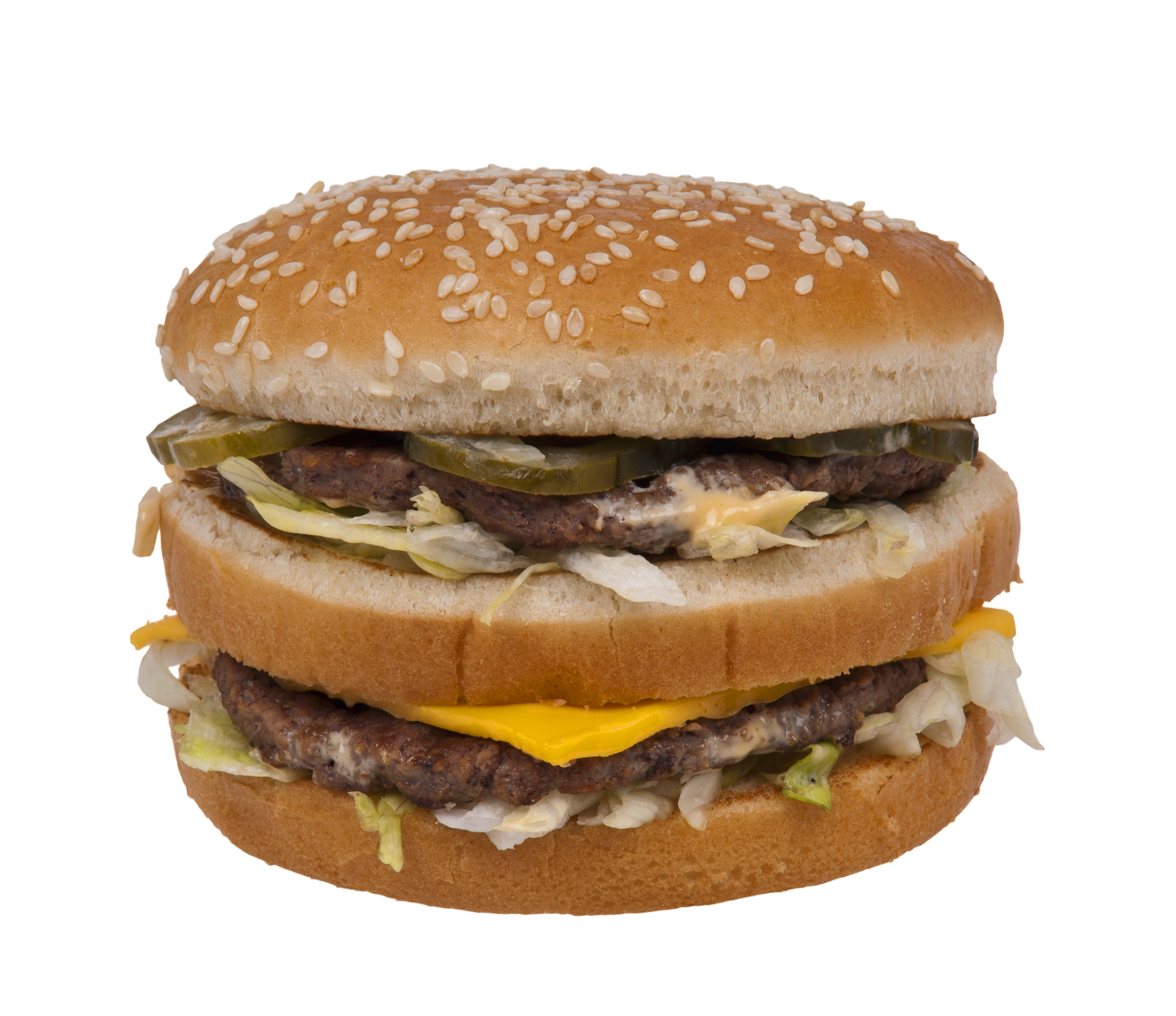
One of billions of Big Macs

- American inspectors were allowed to make a second inspection of Israel's Negev Nuclear Research Center near Dimona, and concluded that although Israel was not developing atomic weapons, the Jewish state "was aiming to reach a point where it could have a nuclear option at a moment's notice"; seven weeks later, on May 28, the Israelis would assemble two nuclear bombs in preparation for war.
- Walter Ulbricht was unanimously re-elected as leader of East Germany's Communist Party, the Socialist Unity Party of Germany (SED) in a vote by the party's Central Committee. Former British spy Klaus Fuchs, who provided American nuclear secrets to the Soviet Union, was named one of the new members of the 120-member Committee.
- Born:
  - Sherri Shepherd, American TV comedian and co-host of The View; in Chicago
  - Sheryl Lee, American TV and film actress; in Augsburg, West Germany
- Died: Tom Conway, 62, British film, radio and TV actor

== April 23, 1967 (Sunday) ==
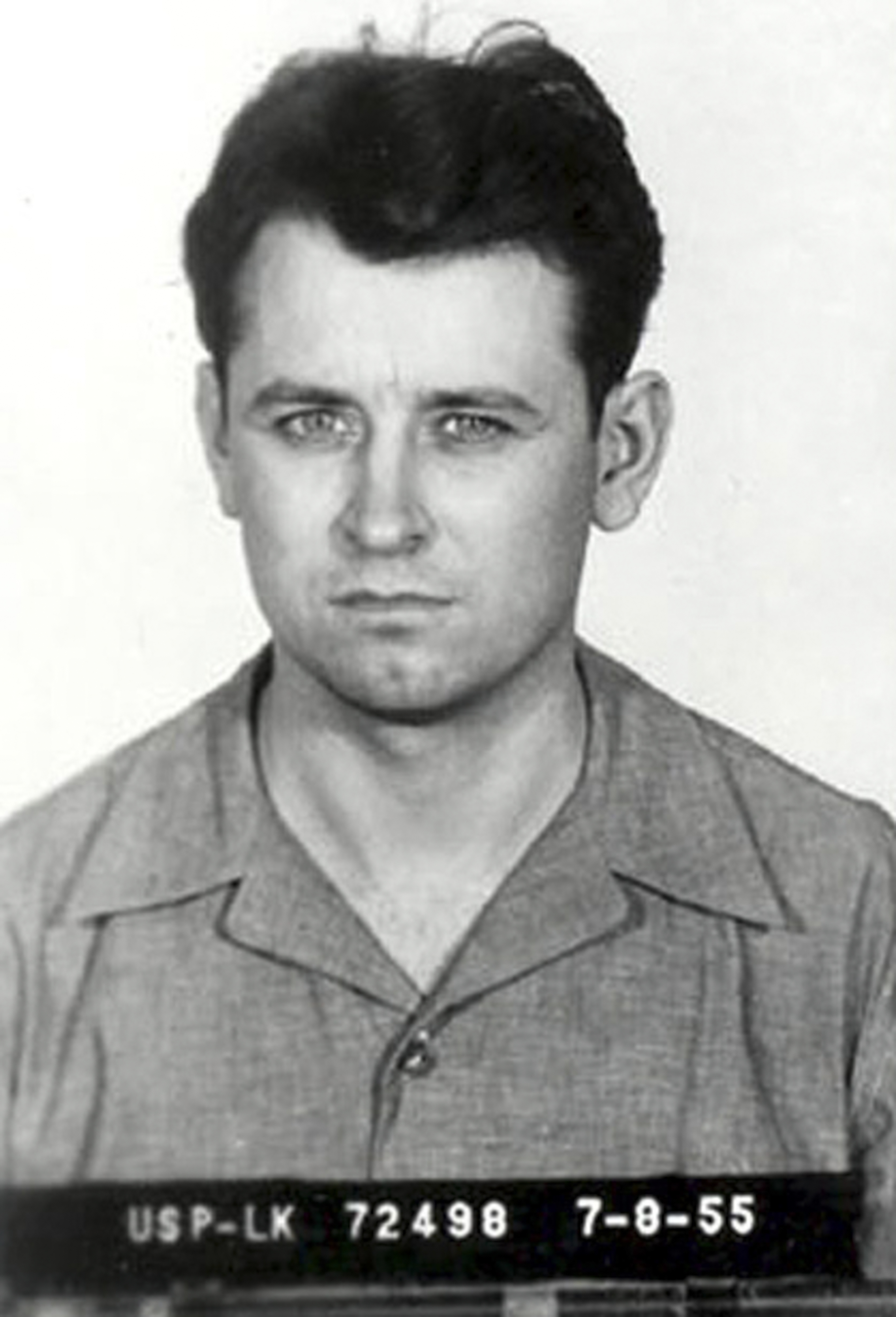
Ray

- James Earl Ray, a 39-year old convict serving a 20-year sentence for armed robbery, escaped from the Missouri State Penitentiary in Jefferson City. He would later tell interrogators that other inmates helped him conceal himself inside a four-foot by four-foot container that was used to deliver loaves of bread to prisons in the area, then helped load him onto a truck. Forty-nine weeks later, on April 4, 1968, Ray allegedly committed the assassination of Martin Luther King Jr. in Memphis, Tennessee, and would finally be recaptured on June 10 of that year at Heathrow Airport in London.
- The Soviet Union announced the launch of Air Force Colonel Vladimir Komarov on "a powerful new carrier rocket" as Soyuz 1 was sent into orbit at 3:35 a.m. local time from Baikonur on what was to be a 72-hour mission. In a separate announcement, the Soviet news agency Tass suggested that it would soon send up a second spacecraft that would link to Soyuz 1, and that the pilots would trade places. Soyuz 2 would have been launched the next day with Valery Bykovsky, Yevgeny Khrunov and Aleksei Yeliseyev, but Soyuz 1 began experiencing problems soon after launch.
- Born: Melina Kanakaredes, American actress; in Akron, Ohio
- Died: Edgar Neville, 67, Spanish playwright and film director

== April 24, 1967 (Monday) ==
- Soviet cosmonaut Vladimir Komarov became the first person to be killed during a spaceflight when the parachute of his space capsule Soyuz 1 failed during re-entry. The capsule crashed at 8:24 a.m. local time, 40 miles (64 km) east of the city of Orsk, and rescuers found that "the base of the spacecraft had been completely burned through" and that Komarov's remains had been burned into a "blackened lump measuring 30 x 80 cm". His launch the day before had been complicated by a drain of battery power caused by the failure of a solar panel to deploy, and he had made 18 orbits at a lower altitude than planned. On his last three circuits of the Earth, as the orbit was decaying due to friction, he was having difficulty controlling the vehicle before he made his emergency re-entry. In the investigation that followed, it was found that the parachute design for the Soyuz capsules had been faulty and that the manufacture and testing had been poor, resulting in "the chilling conclusion that had Soyuz 2 been launched, that crew would also have perished on its return."
- The Philadelphia 76ers defeated the San Francisco Warriors, 125–122, in game six of the NBA Championship series, to win the title. Playing at home, San Francisco had a 12-point lead in the third quarter. In the final 15 seconds, when Philadelphia had a 123–122 lead, the Warriors' Rick Barry (who made 44 points in the game) missed a shot that would have put his team ahead.
- Died:
  - Jacques Brunius, 60, French actor and director
  - Frank Overton, 49, American film actor, died from a heart attack.

== April 25, 1967 (Tuesday) ==
- John A. Love, the Republican Governor of Colorado, signed a bill giving Colorado the most liberal abortion law in the United States. Under the law's terms, if a three-member board in an accredited hospital agreed unanimously that a pregnancy met one of four specified conditions (death or serious impairment to the mother, the likelihood of a child being born with a "grave and permanent physical deformity or mental retardation", a pregnancy of less than 16 weeks arising from forcible rape or incest, or a girl under the age of 16 made pregnant by rape or incest). Previously, Colorado and other states in the U.S. allowed abortion of a pregnancy only in cases of "a severe threat to the physical health of the mother" or "pregnancies resulting from forcible rape"; Love said that letters and telegrams were "about 2,600 against and about 2,400 for the bill". On May 17, the state director of health and hospitals announced that a 12-year old rape victim would be given the first legalized abortion in the United States. The reform of the law took place in the wake of an increase of babies born with birth defects; North Carolina and California would make similar changes in their laws later in the year, and Georgia and Maryland would follow in 1968.
- A bus crash killed 27 people in Kiev when the vehicle they were on sank into the Dnieper River in the Ukrainian SSR. In a departure from the existing Soviet policy to not publicize accidents, the newspaper for the Ukrainian SSR Communist Party reported the accident nine days later. Government investigators concluded that the driver had "violated traffic rules by passing a truck, causing the bus to become accidentally hitched to a streetcar bumper", then swerved out of control and crashed through a guard rail. Only five people were rescued from the river.
- The colony of Swaziland was made a protectorate by the United Kingdom, with internal self-government. The Ngwenyama (Paramount Chief) of the Swazi people, Sobhuza II, was recognized as King and head of the government. Full independence would be granted on September 6, 1968.
- The U.S. Senate voted unanimously (88 to 0) to ratify the 79-nation Outer Space Treaty prohibiting weapons in outer space.
- Died:
  - U.S. Air Force Brigadier General Benjamin Foulois, 87, one of the original military aviators to be trained by the Wright brothers
  - Joseph Boxhall, 83, British sailor, fourth officer of the RMS Titanic

== April 26, 1967 (Wednesday) ==
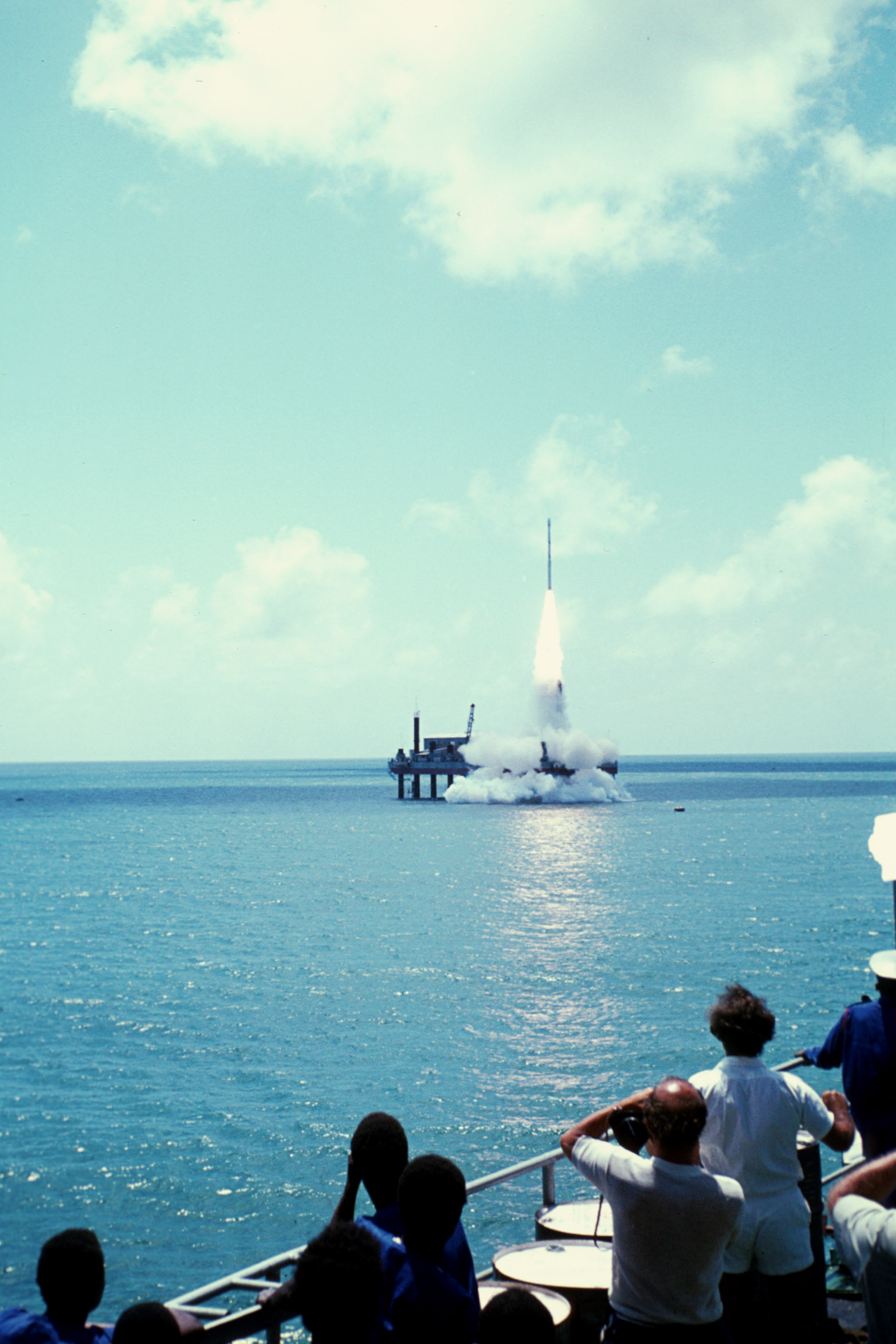
Sending up a San Marco satellite from the Indian Ocean launch platform

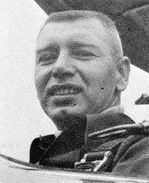
Lt. Commander Estocin

- For the first time, a satellite was launched into orbit from an ocean platform. San Marco B, the second satellite in Italy's space program (and the first to be sent up from Kenya) soared into space under the direction of an all-Italian team of 100 scientists. From a converted oil drilling rig in the Indian Ocean, a few miles off the coast of Malindi, an American Scout B rocket carried the 285-pound (129 kg) research satellite into an equatorial orbit. The satellite's purpose was to gather "data on air density and ionospheric conditions above the earth's equator." It would re-enter the atmosphere on October 14 after 171 days in orbit.
- Born:
  - Kane (stage name for Glenn T. Jacobs), Spanish-born American professional wrestler and politician; in Torrejón de Ardoz
  - Marianne Jean-Baptiste, English film actress; in Camberwell
- Died: U.S. Navy Lieutenant Commander Michael J. Estocin, 35, was shot down over North Vietnam while leading his second airstrike in six days from the USS Ticonderoga (CV-14), with a mission to destroy North Vietnamese thermal power plants at Haiphong and the surface-to-air missile sites defending the plants. On his first mission, Estocin took out three of the missile sites before his A-4 Skyhawk plane was damaged by an SA-2 Guideline missile. Despite the damage, he took out another missile site before gliding back to the Ticonderoga. On his final mission, Estocin's A-4 was struck by another missile, and he fired his own missiles before plunging to the ground. Estocin would be promoted posthumously to the rank of captain and would be awarded the Medal of Honor in 1978 for "conspicuous gallantry and intrepidity at the risk of his life above and beyond the call of duty on 20 and 26 April 1967".

== April 27, 1967 (Thursday) ==
- Construction of Moscow's Ostankino Tower, at 540 metres (1,770 ft) the tallest free-standing structure in the world up to that time, was completed with the placement of the last antenna on the television transmitter.
- The 1967 Cannes Film Festival opened.
- Expo 67, described as "the largest, costliest, gaudiest world's fair in history", was dedicated in Montreal as a World's Fair to coincide with the celebration of the centennial of the 1867 founding of the Canadian Confederation. Prime Minister Lester B. Pearson ignited the Expo Flame in the Place des Nations to inaugurate "The Universal and International Exhibition of 1967", which would run until October 27.
- Born: Willem-Alexander, King of the Netherlands since 2013. He was the first boy to be born in the Netherlands royal family since 1851 and was the great-grandson of former Queen Wilhelmina (who reigned 1890 to 1948), the grandson of reigning Queen Juliana (1948 to 1980), and son of future Queen Beatrix (1980 to 2013).
- Died: William Douglas Cook, 82, founder of Eastwoodhill Arboretum and the garden at Pukeiti, New Zealand

== April 28, 1967 (Friday) ==
Expo 67 logo

- Expo 67 opened to the public, with over 310,000 people attending on the first day. The very first visitor, as noted by Expo officials, was an American, Al Carter of Chicago. Carter, a jazz drummer, had been waiting at the main gate since 10:00 the previous morning.
- World heavyweight boxing champion Muhammad Ali refused to take the oath of induction into the United States Army after reporting as scheduled to an induction center in Houston, Texas. Ali stood in line with 11 other inductees, underwent a physical examination, blood tests and x-rays, but refused to step forward when his name was called by Army Lt. Steven Dunkley. He then told Navy Lt. C. P. Hartman that he understood the penalties and said that his refusal was based on his religious beliefs. The World Boxing Association stripped Ali of his boxing title on the same day; he would not be allowed to fight for the title again until 1970. On June 20, Ali would be convicted of draft evasion, fined $10,000 and sentenced to five years in prison, but the U.S. Supreme Court would overturn the conviction on June 28, 1967.
- U.S. Army General William C. Westmoreland, commander of U.S. forces in the Vietnam War, spoke to a joint session of the U.S. Congress in hopes of raising a budget for additional servicemen beyond the 470,000 who were already in South Vietnam. As an author would note later, "Never before had a military commander addressed Congress while he was directing an ongoing war." Westmoreland told Congress that he would need a minimum of 80,500 more troops and hoped that he could have 200,000 more men at his disposal.
- U.S. Army Corporal Dennis Brown returned to his home in Hinckley, Ohio, five days after his parents had mistakenly been told that he had been killed in action in Vietnam. Corporal Brown took his girlfriend to a high school senior prom, then returned to duty at the end of May.
- Aircraft manufacturers McDonnell Aircraft and Douglas Aircraft Company merged to form McDonnell Douglas Corporation. Boeing would buy the company out three decades later.

== April 29, 1967 (Saturday) ==
- Voters in the northeastern portion of New South Wales rejected a proposal to make the New England region the eighth state of Australia. The final result of the referendum on the New England New State Movement was 155,544 "yes" votes and 184,823 "no" votes. Boundaries of the proposed new state stretched northwest from Newcastle to Walgett and included Muswellbrook and Gunnedah. If the measure had passed, a "yes" vote would have been required in a referendum of voters in New South Wales, and if that had succeeded, the Commonwealth would still have had to vote on approving the division.
- Fidel Castro announced that all intellectual property belonged to the world's people and that Cuba intended to translate and publish technical literature without compensation. "We proclaim publicly that we consider all intellectual products patrimony to which all humanity has a right," Castro said in a televised speech.
- Izvestia became the first daily newspaper in the Soviet Union to publish a comic strip. "Ivan Ivanich", which appeared on Saturdays, was described in a UPI dispatch as "a pipe-puffing engineer with a Dagwood haircut" who "uses heavyhanded humor to point up shortcomings in Soviet services".
- U.S. President Lyndon Johnson announced that he would ask Congress for $198 million toward financing the development of the $1.14 billion SST, the proposed supersonic transport airplane that would be capable of flying at 1,800 miles per hour (2,900 km/h) and carrying 300 passengers.
- Aretha Franklin's signature song, "Respect", was released by Atlantic Records and would reach #1 by June. Although Otis Redding had written and recorded the song in 1965, Franklin added the chorus "R-E-S-P-E-C-T, find out what it means to me".
- Born:
  - Curtis "CuJo" Joseph, Canadian NHL hockey goaltender; in Richmond Hill, Ontario
  - Rachel Williams, American supermodel; in New York City
- Died:
  - Claude R. Wickard, 74, former U.S. Secretary of Agriculture (1940 to 1945), was killed in an auto accident near Delphi, Indiana, after he turned his car into the path of an oncoming truck.
  - Anthony Mann, 60, American film actor and director, died in West Berlin while directing some location shots for his final film, A Dandy in Aspic.
  - J. B. Lenoir, 38, African-American blues musician, died from a heart attack three weeks after injuring his chest in an automobile accident.

== April 30, 1967 (Sunday) ==
- Under federal law, daylight saving time went into effect throughout the United States for the first time, with the 1966 Uniform Time Act mandating that clocks be set ahead one hour at 2:00 in the morning on the last Sunday in April and then turned back one hour on the last Sunday in October. However, the law provided that any state could seek exemption from compliance by the United States Department of Transportation, and five of the 50 states chose to effectively change time zones rather than to change their clocks. The legislatures of Michigan and Hawaii voted to be exempt, and Alaska applied for a delay so that it could delineate its time zones. In Indiana and Kentucky, which shifted from the Eastern to Central time zones, the matter was complicated further because local governments were allowed the option to move their clocks forward if they chose, such as Dearborn County, Indiana or Muhlenberg County, Kentucky.
- The British cabinet voted, 13 to 8, to seek the admission of the United Kingdom into the European Economic Community, referred to at the time as the "Common Market". Prime Minister Harold Wilson would announce his plans on May 2 and the House of Commons would approve the resolution, 488 to 62.
- U.S. Senator and former presidential candidate Barry Goldwater retired from military service with the rank of major general in the United States Air Force Reserve.
- Born:
  - James Surowiecki, American journalist; in Meriden, Connecticut
  - Philipp Kirkorov, Bulgarian-born Russian pop singer; in Varna
