= Walter Bortz =

Walter Bortz may refer to:

- Walter Bortz II (1930–2023), American physician and author
- Walter M. Bortz III, educator and higher education administrator
