= May 1967 =

Month of 1967

| << | May 1967 | | | | | >> |
| Su | Mo | Tu | We | Th | Fr | Sa |
| | 1 | 2 | 3 | 4 | 5 | 6 |
| 7 | 8 | 9 | 10 | 11 | 12 | 13 |
| 14 | 15 | 16 | 17 | 18 | 19 | 20 |
| 21 | 22 | 23 | 24 | 25 | 26 | 27 |
| 28 | 29 | 30 | 31 |

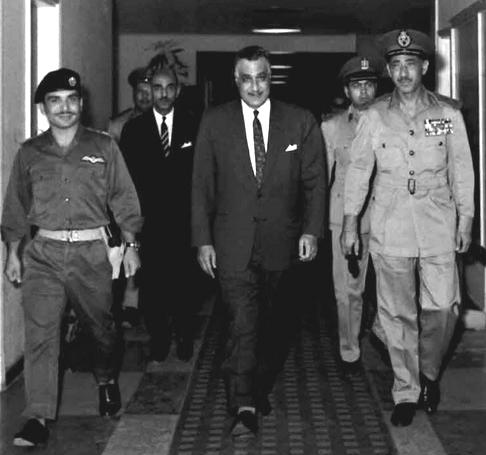
May 30, 1967: King Hussein of Jordan signs alliance against Israel with Egypt's President Nasser

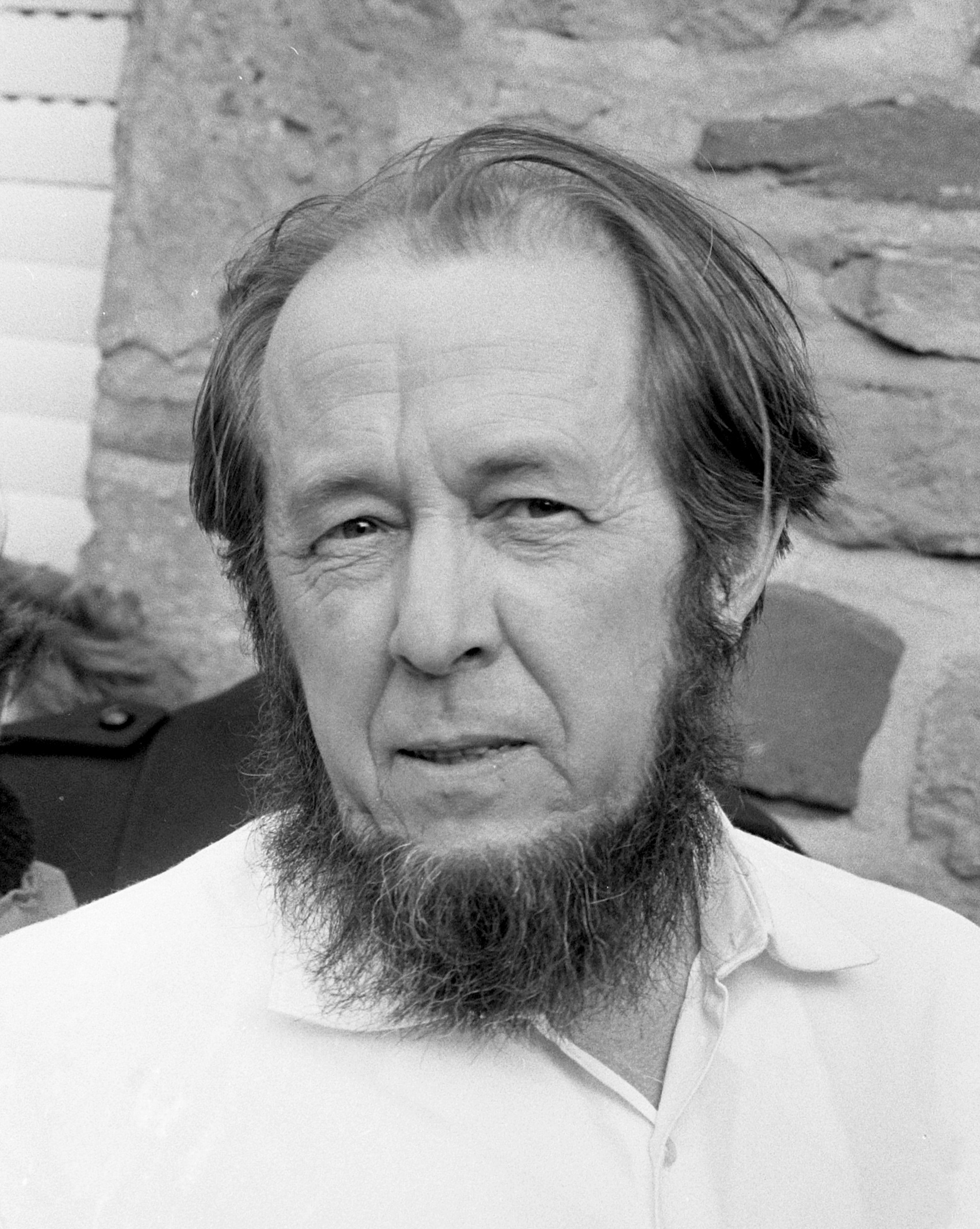
May 16, 1967: Solzhenitsyn takes stand against the Soviet government

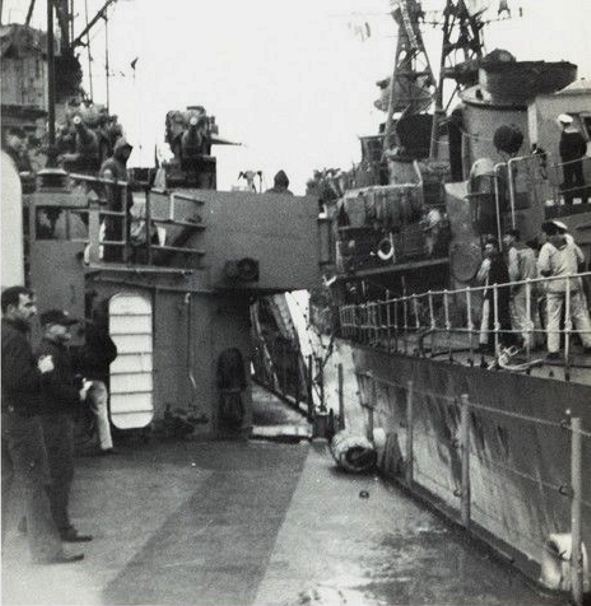
May 10, 1967: Soviet destroyer Besslednyi collides with American destroyer USS Walker

The following events occurred in May 1967:

== May 1, 1967 (Monday) ==
- With aspirations to become the fourth United States commercial television network (after NBC, CBS and ABC), the United Network began broadcasting on more than 100 independent stations at 11:00 p.m. Eastern Time (8:00 p.m. Pacific Time) with its first and only program, The Las Vegas Show, a two-hour long weeknight variety show telecast in color. Comedian Bill Dana was the regular host, and his first guests were comedian Milton Berle, singer Abbe Lane, and the comedy team of Allen & Rossi. Lacking sufficient national sponsors and facing the enormous costs of using overland coaxial cables to relay the program to affiliates, the network would fold after 23 performances of The Las Vegas Show, with the last one ending at 1:00 in the morning Eastern time on June 1, after the May 31 program that featured singer Gilbert Price.
- Anastasio Somoza Debayle was sworn in as the new President of Nicaragua, succeeding Lorenzo Guerrero.
- Elvis Presley and Priscilla Beaulieu were married in a brief civil ceremony at the Aladdin Hotel in Las Vegas.
- Born: Tim McGraw, American country singer; in Delhi, Louisiana
- Died: Klavdia Andreyevna Kosygin, 58, wife of Soviet Premier Alexei Kosygin, collapsed and died while she, her husband, and other Soviet leaders were reviewing the annual May Day military parade in Moscow. Mrs. Kosygin had been seriously ill and undergoing cancer treatment for nearly six months, although her illness had not been disclosed in the Soviet press.

== May 2, 1967 (Tuesday) ==
- Led by Huey P. Newton, a group of 40 members of the Black Panthers, armed with shotguns, rifles and pistols, forced their way into a session of the California House of Representatives at the state capitol building in Sacramento, as a protest against gun control. The California Assembly was debating passage of a bill that would forbid the carrying of a loaded firearm into any public place in the state. No violence took place, other than scuffling between some of the Panthers and the state police who responded to the incident. Sacramento city police stopped five cars that were bringing another 26 armed men join the 40 inside the capitol, and confiscated 15 weapons. As for the men in the capitol building, the police declined to make arrests because there was no violation of the law, and the weapons were returned to the group.
- The Toronto Maple Leafs won the Stanley Cup for the last time of the 20th century. More than 50 years later, the Leafs have not returned to the Stanley Cup Finals. The game also marked the last for the National Hockey League as a six-team league, as six expansion teams would begin play in the fall.
- Harold Wilson announced in the House of Commons that the United Kingdom would apply for EEC membership. Four years earlier, in 1963, France's President Charles de Gaulle had vetoed the UK's attempt to join the EEC.
- In the Democratic primary election in Gary, Indiana, Mayor A. Martin Katz was defeated for renomination by an African-American challenger, city councilman Richard G. Hatcher, by a wide margin.

== May 3, 1967 (Wednesday) ==
- The U.S. Marines captured the heavily fortified peaks of "Hill 881" near Khe Sanh, south of the demilitarized zone between North Vietnam and South Vietnam after a three-day battle between the 3rd brigade of the USMC 9th Infantry, and the 514th Viet Cong battalion. Ninety-six of the Marines were killed in the battle, and an estimated 181 Viet Cong died. During the 16-day fight in the Khe Sanh hills, 168 Americans and 824 Viet Cong were killed between April 24 and May 9.
- In the South Korean presidential election, incumbent President Park Chung Hee of the Democratic Republican Party received 5,688,666 votes (51.4%) to the 4,526,541 (40.9%) for Yun Bo-seon of the New Democratic Party. Four other candidates split the remaining 7.7%.
- Kuwait granted the Spanish government-owned oil exploration company Hispanoil, a 49% interest in a 33-year oil exploration concession for 10,000 square kilometers of Kuwaiti land, with the Kuwait National Petroleum Company having the other 51%.
- The Convention of the International Hydrographic Organization was signed in Monaco.
- Born: Kenny Hotz, Canadian TV producer and actor; in Toronto

== May 4, 1967 (Thursday) ==
- A 16-month old boy, Rupert Burtan of Pittsford, New York, survived an 8-story fall from the 14th floor of the Essex Inn in Chicago, where his father, a physician, was attending the American Industrial Hygiene conference. The boy landed on the sundeck of the fifth floor, beside a swimming pool, and was conscious and crying. Four days later, he was reported to be "doing quite well" at a hospital. His father would later sue the hotel for the child's serious injuries.
- Lunar Orbiter 4 was launched by the United States from Cape Kennedy at 6:25 p.m. and would become, on May 8, the first probe to enter into a polar orbit around the Moon. In addition to getting the first pictures of the lunar south pole, the probe was also able to photograph 99% of the near side of the Moon.
- The U.S. state of Wisconsin became the last in the United States to end its criminal ban on the sale of yellow margarine, which was legal in the other 49 states, as the state Senate joined the House in voting to end the prohibition.

== May 5, 1967 (Friday) ==
- The World Journal Tribune, a New York City evening newspaper formed eight months earlier in a merger of the World-Telegram & Sun, the Journal-American and the Herald Tribune during the city's newspaper strike, ceased publication. During its brief existence, the WJT was nicknamed "the Widget"; Hendrik Hertzberg, commentator for The New Yorker, would later comment that "This ghastly amalgam— which contained, one way or another, the bones of a dozen once great newspapers— expired like an overfed cannibal".
- NASA announced its revision of the Apollo program and its Apollo Applications Program, with plans to have the Apollo orbiter ready to support the first four launches; to have the Orbital Workshop (OWS) space station ready in early 1969, the Apollo Telescope Mount (ATM) in mid-1969; and to launch two more AAP flights in 1969 to revisit the orbital workshop, refurbishing and reusing refurbished command modules flown in 1968's earth-orbiting Apollo flights in 1968. AAP missions for 1970 low Earth orbit missions would launch a crewed command module (CSM) and an unmanned experiment module at the same time, and two other launches of CSMs in order to maintain operation of the OWS station.

== May 6, 1967 (Saturday) ==
- Rioting broke out in Hong Kong that would ultimately see 51 people killed and more than 800 injured during a clash between police and 650 workers who had been fired from the Hong Kong Artificial Flower Works. A historian of the riots would later comment that "the sacking of the workers was the immediate trigger for Hong Kong's worst political violence that would claim 51 lives and prompt a huge social shake-up." The event that started the violence was when 150 workers blocked trucks attempting to ship out the day's production of goods at 4:00 in the afternoon. At 4:20, when non-striking workers attempted to load a truck, strikers rushed at foreman Hung Biu and scuffling broke out, followed half an hour later by the arrival of the police.
- In a game marked by fan violence, visiting Manchester United clinched the title of The Football League in England in its penultimate game of the regular 1966–67 season, with a 6–1 win over West Ham United at Upton Park. Manchester U fans "were rapidly gaining notoriety for their violent exploits", and over 20 people were hospitalized for injuries during and after the match. "The interaction with Manchester United fans that day", an author would note later, "marked an important change in young West Ham fans' commitment to confronting opposing fan groups." In September, when Manchester United and its fans returned to East London, West Ham fans were ready for retaliation.
- The escalation of aerial bombardment in the Vietnam War reached a milestone with the flying of the 10,000th bombing sortie by a B-52. During the first 10,000 missions, 190,000 tons of bombs had been dropped on North Vietnam and on Viet Cong strongholds in South Vietnam.
- Boats carrying about 200 people to a rally at Chengtu in support of CCP Chairman Mao Zedong were rammed and sunk by anti-Maoist members of the Red Guards on the Yangtze River. According to Japan's Kyodo News Agency, "all except 20 drowned in the swift-flowing river".
- Dr. Zakir Husain, the candidate of the ruling Congress Party, became the first Muslim to be elected President of India, defeating former Chief Justice of India K. Subba Rao.
- Died: Zhou Zuoren, 82, Chinese essayist

== May 7, 1967 (Sunday) ==
- A CIA-sponsored U-2 reconnaissance aircraft, flown from Taiwan by a Nationalist Chinese pilot, flew at high altitude over the People's Republic of China, and dropped a package of instruments designed to monitor nuclear testing by the Communist nation. It was the only known instance, in 102 Taiwanese piloted U-2 missions over the Mainland, where a package was deployed. The sensor package failed, and Nationalist Chinese overflights of the People's Republic would halt in 1968.
- In Tel Aviv, Prime Minister Levi Eshkol's Ministerial Committee on Security conditionally approved commencing a war with an attack on Syria.
- Born: Martin Bryant, Australian mass shooter who murdered 35 people and injured 23 others in the Port Arthur massacre between 28 and 29 April 1996; in Hobart, Tasmania

== May 8, 1967 (Monday) ==
- In a 7–2 decision in the case of Redrup v. New York, the United States Supreme Court reversed convictions, for sale and distribution of obscene books and magazines, for defendants from New York, Kentucky, and Arkansas, concluding that under the First Amendment, the state "may not constitutionally inhibit distribution of literary material as obscene" unless three conditions were met: (1) the dominant theme must appeal to "a prurient interest in sex"; (2) the material must be "patently offensive"; and (3) the material must be "utterly without redeeming social value."
- The International Olympic Committee announced that all athletes competing in the 1968 Olympic Games would be required to undergo a gender verification test (commonly referred to as a "sex test") as well as a test for "doping" with performance enhancing drugs such as anabolic steroids.
- The Philippine province of Davao was ordered split into three separate provinces, with the creation of Davao del Norte, Davao del Sur, and Davao Oriental, effective July 1, 1967; on June 17, 1972, the name of Davao del Norte would be changed back to Davao.
- The Soviet Union unveiled its Tomb of the Unknown Soldier in Moscow, near the walls of the Kremlin, in commemoration of the 22nd anniversary of V-E Day and the Great Patriotic War, the Soviet triumph over Nazi Germany during World War II.
- Canada's National Defence Act was passed into law, providing for the unification of the Royal Canadian Navy, the Canadian Army and the Royal Canadian Air Force into a single service, the Canadian Armed Forces.
- The revised Apollo Applications Program canceled plans for the September 15, 1968 launch of an Earth-orbital test of the lunar mapping and scientific survey (LM&SS) equipment, which would have been jettisoned after the test.
- Died:
  - LaVerne Andrews, 55, oldest of the American singing trio The Andrews Sisters died of cancer.
  - Elmer Rice, 74, American playwright and Pulitzer Prize winner, died of a heart attack.
  - Barbara Payton, 39, American film actress, died from liver failure.

== May 9, 1967 (Tuesday) ==
- Dr. Gijsbert van Hall, Mayor of Amsterdam for the past 10 years, was fired by Netherlands Prime Minister Piet de Jong after Amsterdam police had been unable to control attacks by youth gangs who called themselves "The Provos".
- Born: Ahmed Ressam, Algerian terrorist and al-Qaeda member whose plot to bomb the Los Angeles International Airport on December 31, 1999 was foiled by the U.S. Customs Service; in Bou Ismaïl
- Died: Philippa Schuyler, 35, American pianist and former child prodigy; in a helicopter crash. Schuyler, who was in South Vietnam as a special newspaper correspondent for the Manchester (NH) Union-Leader, had been scheduled to leave three days earlier had stayed on and was assisting in the evacuation of Catholic schoolchildren from Hue to Da Nang. She and one of the children drowned when the helicopter fell into Da Nang Bay, while another 16 people survived.

== May 10, 1967 (Wednesday) ==
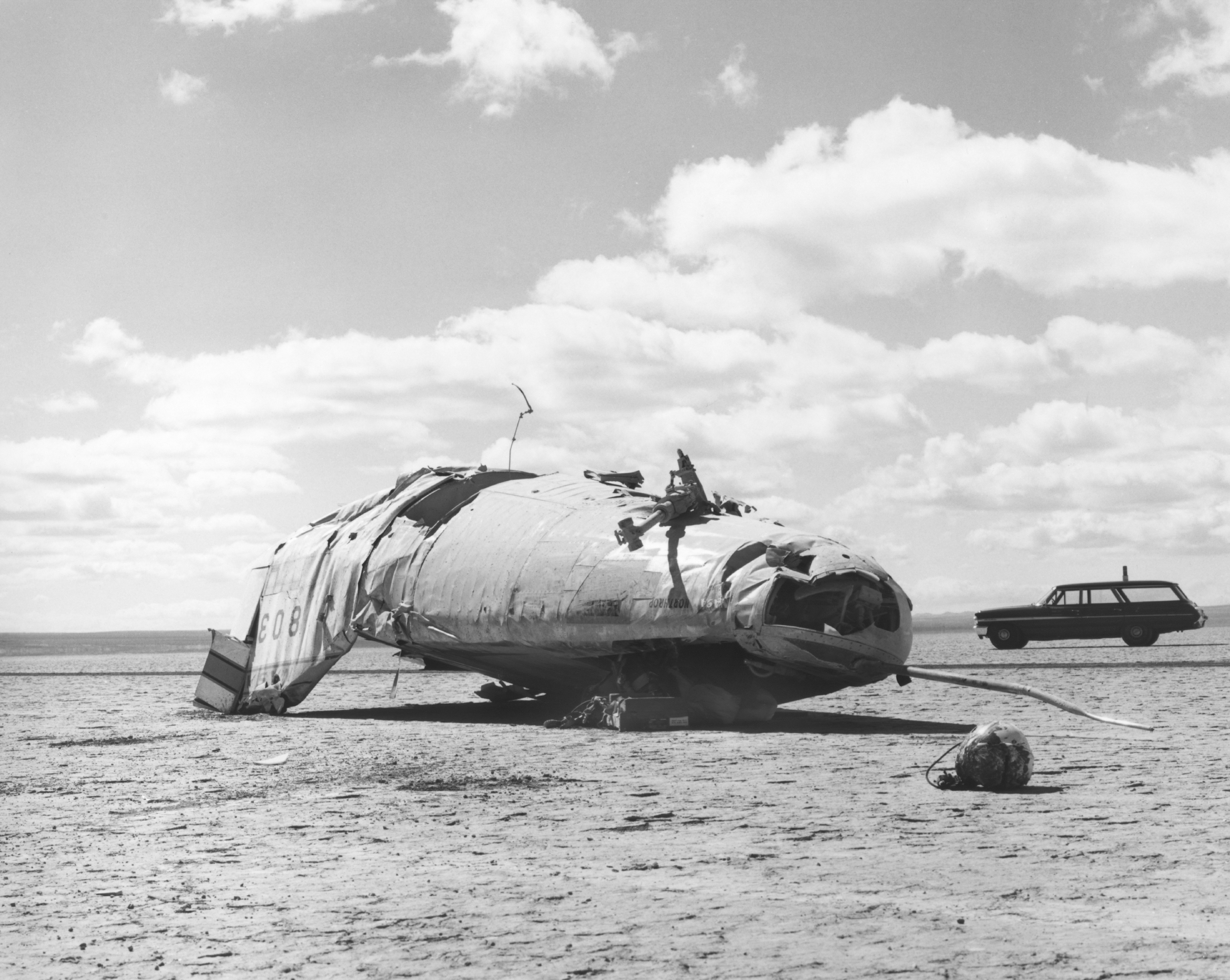
Wreckage of Northrop M2-F2 lifting body

- Test pilot Bruce Peterson was injured when he was attempting to land the Northrop M2-F2 lifting body glider, described as a "flatiron-shaped... wingless spacecraft designed to reenter the Earth's atmosphere and make a maneuverable landing." After regaining control of the M2-F2 when it unexpectedly began rolling, Peterson "found himself with a new problem" because his angle of lift was so high that he could not see the runway markers as he made his descent. Stalling the M2-F2 so that he could lower his angle, he landed in the desert at 217 miles per hour (349 km/h), but "the vehicle suddenly bounced back up", twisted, and then crashed. Peterson would endure multiple surgeries for the next two years, including 18 months of facial reconstruction, and would even return to being a test pilot in 1970, before taking a desk job at NASA. Ironically, "The film of his accident was used in the 1970s TV series The Six Million Dollar Man", about a test pilot rebuilt by surgeons following a crash.
- The Soviet Navy destroyer Besslednyi collided with the U.S. Navy destroyer USS Walker while the latter was making maneuvers in the Sea of Japan. The U.S. protested to the USSR that the Besslednyi had deliberately made several close approaches to four ships in a task group over a 90-minute period. Damage to both ships was minor. The next day, 210 miles (340 km) east of the first collision, another Soviet destroyer (identified as Krupnyv class 025) collided with the USS Walker, and punched a six-inch hole into the starboard bow.
- Hundreds of students at the historically black Jackson State College (now Jackson State University) rioted after local police drove on to campus to arrest a student for speeding. The police barricaded Lynch Street in Jackson, and the next day, members of the state national guard fired on the crowd, killing a bystander, Ben Brown, who had been out running an errand. Three years later, violence would erupt again and two students would be shot by guardsmen during protests 11 days after the Kent State shootings.
- Three boys in Hannibal, Missouri, disappeared after traveling into one of the many caves in the area, and would still be missing half a century later, despite an extensive search. Brothers Joe Hoag, 13, and Billy Hoag, 11, went exploring with Joe's friend, 14-year old Craig Dowell, and did not return. After an 18-day search of 270 caves, the search leader reported that the group had "failed to find a single clue". Years later, no physical evidence had been found.
- By a 488 to 62 vote, with 51 abstentions, the House of Commons of the United Kingdom approved the government's decision to apply for membership in the European Economic Community. On November 27, as he had in 1963, France's President Charles de Gaulle would veto the application.
- Naji Talib resigned as Prime Minister of Iraq. President Abdul Rahman Arif would perform the job for two months until former premier Tahir Yahya was sworn in.
- For a Few Dollars More, the second significant "spaghetti Western" film directed by Sergio Leone, was released in the United States.
- Former Greek Prime Minister Andreas Papandreou was charged with treason by the new Greek military government.
- Born:
  - Young MC (stage name for Marvin Young), English-born American rap artist best known for the song "Bust a Move"; in South Wimbledon
  - Nobuhiro Takeda, Japanese soccer football forward; in Hamamatsu, Shizuoka Prefecture
- Died: Lorenzo Bandini, 31, died three days after being fatally injured in a fiery crash at the 1967 Monaco Grand Prix

== May 11, 1967 (Thursday) ==
- Nikolai Podgorny, President of the Presidium and head of state of the Soviet Union, met in Moscow with a visiting group of Egyptian officials (including future President Anwar Sadat) and provided them a false intelligence report that Israel was mobilizing troops "on the border with Syria and planning to attack between 18 and 22 May 1967". "Although the report was false and Nasser knew it," an observer would later write, Egypt's President Gamal Abdel Nasser mobilized troops along the Egyptian border with Israel three days later. An Israeli historian offered another theory that "Whether or not Nasser believed that Israel was about to attack Syria, he could not afford to remain idle in the face of such a possibility, thus also throwing away the opportunity to regain his position of leadership in the Arab world."
- The parliament of the Socialist Federal Republic of Yugoslavia voted to abolish 10 of the federal ministries and to delegate much of its authority to the nation's six constituent republics authority to make their own regulations for education, culture, health, social services, labor, justice, industry, communications and forestry. The government in Belgrade retained its ministries for foreign affairs, defense, economic and financial affairs, foreign trade, and internal affairs. Common policy in Serbia, Croatia, Bosnia-Herzegovina, Macedonia and Montenegro would be coordinated by new federal councils.
- The milestone of the installation of the 100 millionth telephone in the United States was celebrated by AT&T (American Telephone and Telegraph) in a ceremony that included a conference call between U.S. President Lyndon Johnson and the governors of all 50 states, as well as the governors of Puerto Rico and the Virgin Islands. Reportedly, "the telephone company made no attempt to pinpoint exactly which phone was the 100 millionth installed" during the day.
- Eben Dönges, the President-elect of South Africa, was scheduled to be inaugurated on May 31, but suffered a brain hemorrhage at home and was rushed to the Groote Schuur hospital in Cape Town. He would remain in a coma for the remaining eight months of his life, and would die on January 10.
- The United Kingdom, along with Ireland and Denmark, filed applications for admission into the European Economic Community. At the same time, Britain also applied for membership in the European Atomic Energy Community (Euratom) and the European Coal and Steel Community (ECSC).

== May 12, 1967 (Friday) ==
- Nigeria's President Yakubu Gowon announced in a radio broadcast that he was dividing the nation's four autonomous regions (Northern, Eastern, Western and Mid-Western) into 12 nationally controlled states, in hopes of checking the power of the Eastern Region's military governor, Lt. Colonel Ojukwu. Gowon's Decree Number 14, The States Creation and Transitional Provision, would become official two weeks later, on May 27; In 1976, some of the states would be divided further and the total number would rise to 19.
- The United States enhanced its ability to measure nuclear explosions from outer space as it activated the sensors of two new Vela satellites (Vela 3 and Vela 4) that had been launched at the end of April. The new satellites had instruments that could not only detect the x-rays and gamma rays emitted from the flash of a nuclear explosion, but could also measure the yield of radiation.
- The Jimi Hendrix Experience debuted with the release of their first album, Are You Experienced.
- Born: Paul D'Amour, American musician and was the first bass guitarist for Tool; in Spokane, Washington
- Died: John Masefield, 88, Poet Laureate of the United Kingdom since 1930

== May 13, 1967 (Saturday) ==
- Three million faithful in Portugal turned out to pray with Pope Paul VI during his visit to Fátima, where the 50th anniversary of the May 13, 1917 first reported appearance of the Virgin Mary there. In becoming the first Pope to visit Fátima (and the first to visit Portugal), Paul VI, in the opinion of one historian, brought new legitimacy to the dictatorship of António de Oliveira Salazar and to his Estado Novo.
- In what was described as "a rebuttal to anti-war demonstrations", a crowd of at least 70,000 demonstrators marched down New York City's Fifth Avenue in support of American troops fighting in the Vietnam War.
- Born: Tommy Gunn (stage name for Tommy Strada), American pornographic actor, director and former dancer; in Cherry Hill, New Jersey

== May 14, 1967 (Sunday) ==
- On the pretext of responding to a threatened Israeli invasion of Syria, the UAR's President Nasser sent two divisions of Egyptian army troops across the Suez Canal and into the Sinai peninsula. A historian would later comment that "The size of the force clearly indicates it was intended as a demonstration of Egyptian solidarity with Syria rather than an invasion group," but as tensions escalated, Nasser would follow two days later with a removal of UN Peacekeeping forces from the border with Israel.
- Mickey Mantle of the New York Yankees hit his 500th career home run, becoming only the sixth MLB player (after Babe Ruth, Jimmie Foxx, Mel Ott, Ted Williams and Willie Mays) to make the accomplishment.
- Born: Tony Siragusa, American NFL defensive tackle, pro football analyst, and TV host (d. 2022); in Kenilworth, New Jersey
- Died: Mike Gold (Itzok Isaac Granich), 73, American communist author of proletarian literature

== May 15, 1967 (Monday) ==
- In re Gault, a decision that would lead to a dramatic change in the American juvenile court system and a correction of injustices within the juvenile codes of numerous states, was rendered by the United States Supreme Court. For the first time, the Court ruled that minors were entitled to the same constitutional rights as adults on criminal charges. At the time, there were 48,500 boys and girls in reform schools. The decision arose in the case of 15-year-old Gerald Gault of Gila Bend, Arizona, who had been given a sentence of more than five years at the Arizona industrial school after being convicted of making obscene phone calls to a neighbor. "If Gerald had been over 18," Justice Abe Fortas wrote for the majority opinion, "the maximum punishment would have been a fine of $5 to $50 or imprisonment in jail for not more than two months." He added, "Under our Constitution, the condition of being a boy does not justify a kangaroo court."
- The day after the celebration of the 19th anniversary of the formation of the State of Israel as an independent nation, Israel Defense Forces paraded through the divided city of Jerusalem, in defiance of the 1949 Armistice Agreements and as an apparent response to Egypt's deployment of its armed forces into Sinai in a breach of the 1956 cease-fire agreement that ended the Suez Crisis.
- Born:
  - Madhuri Dixit, six-time award-winning Indian Bollywood film actress; in Mumbai
  - John Smoltz, American baseball pitcher and Hall of Fame member; in Warren, Michigan
- Died:
  - Edward Hopper, 84, American painter
  - Italo Mus, 75, Italian painter

== May 16, 1967 (Tuesday) ==
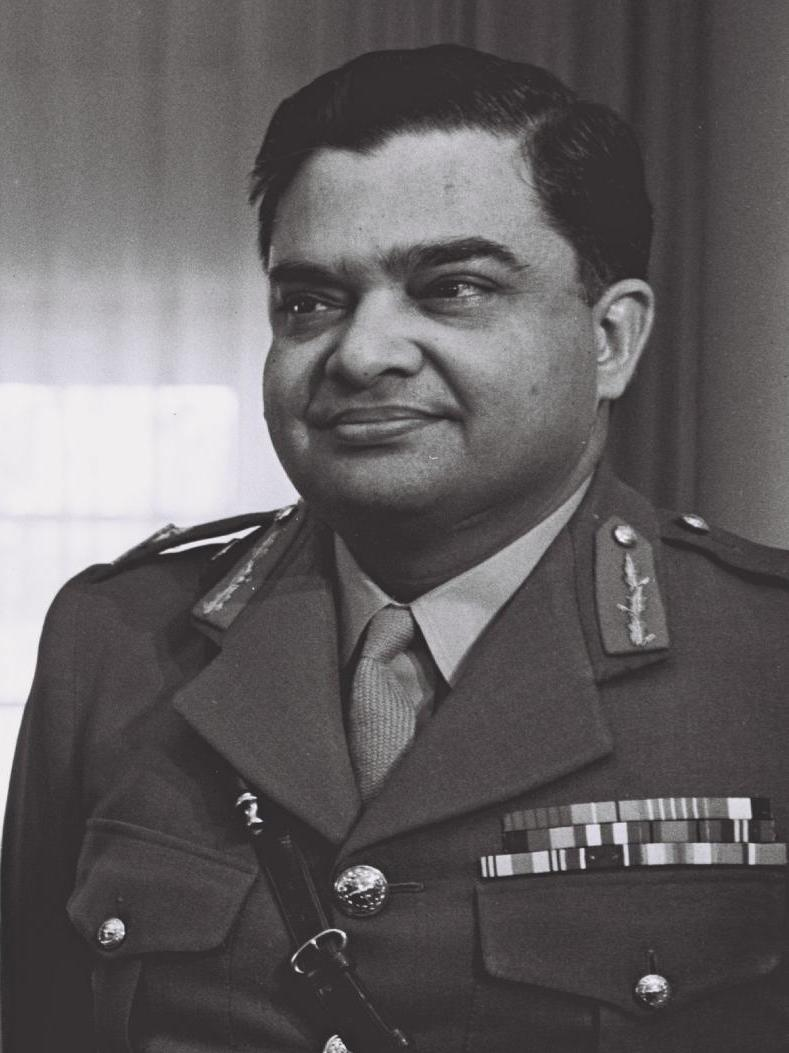
General Rikhye

- Egypt's President Nasser sent a letter to Indian Army General Indar Jit Rikhye, the commander of the 3,400 man UN Emergency Force (UNEF), asking for UNEF's immediate withdrawal from the 117-mile-long (188 km) frontier between Egypt and Israel. "Whether intentionally or not," a historian would write later, "the UAR's desire to evict the UN force after more than a decade ultimately paved the way for the resumption of hostilities between Israel and Egypt in the form of the Six-Day War.
- Russian author Aleksandr Solzhenitsyn took a stand against censorship by the government of the USSR, signing his name to, and mailing, 250 copies of a letter mailed to members of the Union of Soviet Writers and to editors of literary newspapers and magazines. In order to avoid the risk of anyone other than himself being blamed for the contents, he addressed each of the envelopes, in his own writing, prior to the Fourth Writers' Congress. Listing eight instances where he had been silenced by the government, he complained that his work had been "smothered, gagged, and slandered" and called on the recipients to work toward abolishing censorship and defending Union members against unjust persecution.
- Muhammad Ahmad Mahgoub was made Prime Minister of the Sudan for the second time, succeeding Sadiq al-Mahdi.

== May 17, 1967 (Wednesday) ==
- Two MiG-21 jets from the Egyptian Air Force made a surprise flight into Israel's airspace, flew over the Negev Nuclear Research Center and reactor at Dimona in an apparent surveillance of the Jewish state's secret nuclear weapons program, and then were able to cross back over the border into the Sinai before the Israeli Air Force could scramble its jets to intercept. The expectation that the Dimona facility would be attacked by air, as well as President Nasser's deployment of two army divisions in the Sinai the same day, accelerated the crisis that would lead to the Six-Day War.
- The top-ranking Hungarian diplomat in the United States, chargé d'affaires Janos Radvanyi, defected to the U.S. after five years on the job.
- Queen Elizabeth II announced that her 18-year-old son, Prince Charles, would be invested as Prince of Wales in the summer of 1969.
- Josip Broz Tito was re-elected as President of Yugoslavia by a margin of 642 to 2 in the Yugoslavian parliament.
- Died: Vance Drummond, 40, New Zealand-born Australian pilot in the Korean and Vietnam Wars, died when his Dassault Mirage IIIO supersonic fighter crashed into the sea during a training exercise.

== May 18, 1967 (Thursday) ==
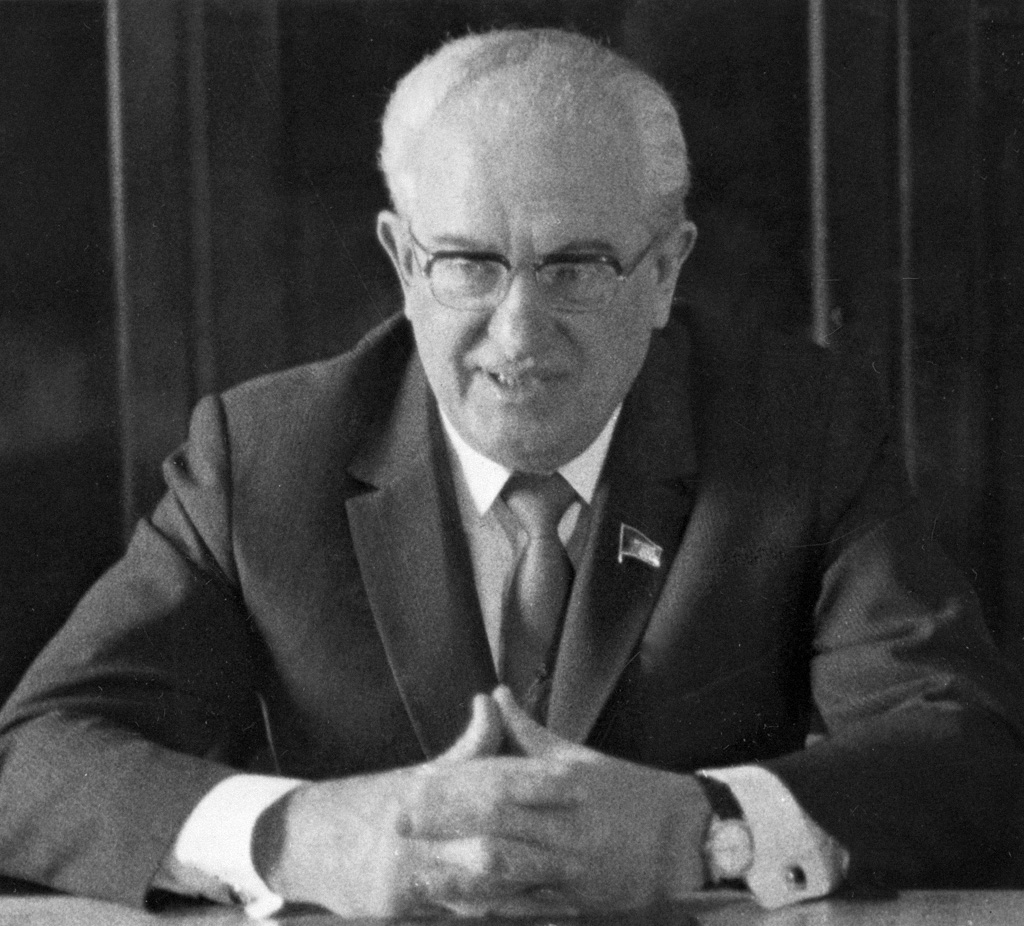
KGB chairman Yuri Andropov

- Yuri Andropov was appointed as the new Director of the Soviet KGB intelligence agency by Soviet Communist Party General Secretary Leonid Brezhnev. In 1982, Andropov would succeed Brezhnev as both First Secretary and as President, and serve a little more than a year before dying in office.
- The U.S. state of Tennessee repealed its law that made the teaching of evolution a criminal offense, as Governor Buford Ellington signed a bill that had rescinded the Butler Act. (Violation of the law had led to the famous Scopes Trial.) On May 16, the state senate had voted, 19–13, in favor of a bill that permitted school teachers to discuss Charles Darwin's theory of evolution in classrooms. The state house of representatives had approved the measure, 66–13, on May 4. The states of Arkansas and Mississippi would be the last to prohibit the teaching of evolution; the U.S. Supreme Court would strike down the remaining state laws as unconstitutional on November 12, 1968.
- For the first time since the Vietnam War began, American and South Vietnamese troops crossed into the Demilitarized Zone (DMZ) that separated North Vietnam and South Vietnam near the 17th parallel. Under the Geneva Accords of 1954, armed troops were not supposed to come into the two kilometer wide DMZ, but Viet Cong and NVA troops from the north had been crossing it for years. Operation Hickory began at dawn as a combined force of 5,500 troops moved into the DMZ on the South Vietnamese side and began engaging the enemy.
- Mexican federal police fired into a crowd of 3,000 peasants in the town of Atoyac de Álvarez, after the Guerrero state government had reversed a decision to dismiss an unpopular school principal and to reinstate fired teacher Lucio Cabañas. Seven people were killed and 20 were wounded. In retaliation, two of the federal police were killed, and the rest fled as armed villagers searched for them. Located west of Acapulco, the town would be retaken four days later by 2,000 troops from the Mexican Army after 11 people had been killed.
- General Electric announced the recall of 90,000 large screen color television sets that had been manufactured between June 1966 and February 1967 because they emitted dangerously high levels of x-rays at a level well above U.S. government radiation limits. The move came six months after the defect had been discovered and six days after the U.S. Public Health Service had suggested that GE voluntarily make the announcement.
- The number of American servicemen killed on that day was 101, as daily U.S. deaths in the war passed 100 for the first time, surpassing February 28, when 61 were killed, and 102 would be killed in action on May 20. For the entire week from May 14 to May 20, the U.S. Department of Defense reported that 337 troops were killed.
- Troops in Syria and in Egypt were placed on maximum alert, while Kuwait announced that it would mobilize its own armed forces.
- Died: Andy Clyde, 75, Scottish-born American film and TV actor

== May 19, 1967 (Friday) ==
- The 3,400-man UN Emergency Force (UNEF) departed from its observation posts along the 117-mile-long (188 km) Egyptian/Israeli frontier in the Gaza Strip, after "a hurriedly organized flag lowering ceremony" ordered by UNEF's commander, Indian Army General Indar Jit Rikhye. At the same time, 12,000 troops of the Palestine liberation army took positions inside the Gaza Strip, and the first of more than 80,000 Egyptian troops and more than 800 tanks began crossing into the Sinai. The action came three days after Egypt's President Nasser had demanded the UN to withdraw its forces, and a day after UN Secretary-General U Thant ordered their departure.
- The Soviet Union ratified the treaty with the United States and the United Kingdom, banning nuclear weapons from outer space.
- Born: Geraldine Somerville, Irish-born British TV and film actress; in County Meath

== May 20, 1967 (Saturday) ==
- In one of the few claims of being injured by a UFO, Stefan "Steve" Michalak was hospitalized for burns to his chest after a trip to the Whiteshell Provincial Park in Canada. The case was investigated by the Royal Canadian Air Force after Michalak, an industrial mechanic, reported that his burns came after the unidentified object departed when he had approached it. The RCAF report noted that soil samples from the alleged landing area had been "found to be radioactive" by a radiologist from Canada's Department of Health and Welfare and that the contamination could not be explained. Michalak recovered from his burns, but would retain a scar pattern on his chest.
- At the close of the week, a record 337 Americans had been killed in battle in the Vietnam War in a single week, as announced by the U.S. Defense Department five days later in its report of the seven days from May 14 to May 20. The Associated Press would note on May 25 that the 337 deaths marked a new milestone of more than 10,000 American servicemen killed in action as it "raised to 10,253 the number of Americans slain and 61,425 the number wounded in the war".
- An attempt to block France's Prime Minister Georges Pompidou from being able to make economic changes, by decree, for six months failed by 11 votes in the National Assembly. The censure motion, which would have blocked the law from coming into effect, required 244 votes to pass and only received 233.
- Born: Crown Prince Paul of Greece, current head of the former Greek royal family as the second child and eldest son of King Constantine II; at Tatoi Palace, Dekelea. If the Greek monarchy, abolished in 1974, were to be re-established, he would become King Paul II upon the death of his father.

== May 21, 1967 (Sunday) ==
- As his prosecution of Clay Shaw continued, New Orleans District Attorney Jim Garrison said at a press conference that President John F. Kennedy had been assassinated by five anti-Castro Cubans who were angry about the failed Bay of Pigs invasion, and that accused assassin Lee Harvey Oswald "did not even touch a gun that day." Garrison said that the Cubans had been on the grassy knoll at Dealey Plaza and behind the wall there.
- Three days after the U.S. Marines crossed into the DMZ separating North and South Vietnam, the Chairman of the Joint Chiefs of Staff, U.S. Army General Earle G. Wheeler Jr., said that the United States had no intention of invading North Vietnam.
- In anticipation of war, Egypt called up its entire military reserve into service, while Palestinian commandos in the Gaza Strip announced that they were ready to attack Israel.
- A freight truck from Syria, loaded with dynamite, exploded at the border post of Ar Ramtha in Jordan and killed 21 bystanders.
- Born: Chris Benoit, Canadian professional wrestler; in Montreal (committed suicide after killing his wife and son, 2007)
- Died: Rexhep Mitrovica, 80 Albanian politician and Axis collaborator who served as Prime Minister of Albania during the Nazi German occupation during 1943 and 1944.

== May 22, 1967 (Monday) ==
- A fire at L'Innovation, the largest department store in Brussels, killed 322 people. The blaze started with two simultaneous explosions at the third-floor restaurant, which was crowded with shoppers who had stopped for lunch, and the children's clothing section on the store's second floor, and was fed by exploding bottles of butane gas and cardboard displays throughout the 5-story building during its "American Week" sale. Belgian police found "anti-American pamphlets demanding a 'clean out' of the store" scattered in the street, and noted that demonstrators had dropped firecrackers and called in a bomb threat the week before to protest the American exhibition. However, suspicions of arson would never be verified. With an estimated 2,500 people inside the building when the fire broke out, an author would note later, "the number of deaths from the fire is blessedly small, considering how high it could have been. Yet 'even' at only 322, the L'Innovation fire is the worst retail department store fire of all time."
- Egypt's President Nasser announced that the Gulf of Aqaba would be closed "to all ships flying Israeli flags or carrying strategic materials", blocking the port of Eilat and Israel's only access to the Indian Ocean.
- Former West German Chancellor Ludwig Erhard resigned as Chairman of the Christian Democratic Union (CDU) political party to make way for Chancellor Kurt Georg Kiesinger.
- Born: Brooke Smith, American TV and film actress best known for Grey's Anatomy; in New York City
- Died: Langston Hughes, 65, African-American author and poet

== May 23, 1967 (Tuesday) ==
- A solar flare disrupted radio communication and NORAD radars over the Northern Hemisphere including three new Ballistic Missile Early Warning Systems (BMEWS). The incident would later be noted as a "nuclear close call" during the Cold War, in that U.S. Air Force officials assumed that the Soviet Union was responsible for jamming the radios, which is considered an act of war, before forecasters confirmed that the flare disrupted the radars.
- At 12:00 noon, Egypt followed through with its threat and closed the Straits of Tiran to Israeli shipping, blocking Israel's southern port of Eilat, and the Jewish nation's access to the Red Sea. According to the Egyptian press, mines were placed at the entrance to the strait and Egyptian torpedo boats were sent in to patrol the area.
- Jordan broke diplomatic relations with neighboring Syria, and ordered Ambassador Assad al-Ustuwani to leave the country, two days after a mine explosion killed 21 people at a border checkpoint between the two Middle East nations.
- Died: Philip Coolidge, 58, American actor, died of lung cancer

== May 24, 1967 (Wednesday) ==
- At noon, U.S. President Johnson convened a National Security Council meeting with 14 advisers to discuss the impending war in the Middle East, and whether Israel had atomic weapons. The memorandum of "Discussion of Middle East Crisis" was only partially declassified in 1983, with more in 1992, but three sections remain top secret, including all the details of "a brief discussion of possible presence of unconventional weapons". CIA Director Richard Helms "was quite positive in stating there were no nuclear weapons in the area", while JCS Chief Wheeler said that he was more skeptical than Helms. Response to the President's question "What do we do?" is still redacted, as well as his response to General Wheeler's statement that "we would have to decide whether we were going to send in forces and confront Nasser directly."
- Because of the Apollo 1 accident in January and the resulting program delays, NASA realigned its Apollo and AAP launch schedules. The new AAP schedule called for 25 Saturn IB and 14 Saturn V launches. Major hardware for these launches would be two Workshops flown on Saturn IB vehicles, two Saturn V Workshops, and three Apollo Telescope Mounts (ATMs). Under this new schedule, the first Workshop launch would come in January 1969.
- Born:
  - Heavy D (stage name for Dwight Myers), Jamaican-born American hip hop rap artist who led Heavy D & the Boyz; in Mandeville, Jamaica (died of a pulmonary embolism, 2011)
  - Andrey Borodin, Russian financier and former President of the Bank of Moscow until his dismissal on accusations of fraud; in Moscow
  - James Baxter, British animator known for works on Disney and DreamWorks films; in Bristol, England

== May 25, 1967 (Thursday) ==
- The Naxalite guerrilla war began in India in the village of Naxalbari in the West Bengal state, when police opened fire on a group of nearly 2,000 local sharecroppers who were protesting their treatment by the landowners. The day before, a local police inspector had been fatally wounded by arrows. In the shooting, seven women, two children and one man were killed. The rebellion would spread into the states of Andhra Pradesh, Maharashtra, Odisha and Madhya Pradesh, where government security forces and private paramilitary groups funded by wealthy landowners worked at suppressing rebels.
- North Korea's general secretary Kim Il Sung delivered a speech to ideologists in the Workers' Party of Korea, titled "On the Immediate Tasks in the Direction of the Party's Propaganda Work", but which would later be referred to as 5.25 kyosi (the "May 25th Instructions"). Song Hye-rang, the sister-in-law of Kim's son, would later write in her memoirs that May 25, 1967, was "the day everything changed" in the closed nation, and a historian would note later that the "Instructions" created the personality cult around General Secretary Kim "and many of the other bizarre traits we associate with the North Korea of the Kim Il-sung era."
- Celtic F.C. of Glasgow, defending Scottish League champions, came from behind to become the first football club from northern Europe to win the European Cup in association football, defeating Inter Milan, 2–1, in the final at Lisbon. The winners of the first 11 European Cups had been from Spain (Real Madrid), Portugal (Benfica) and Italy (A.C. Milan and Inter Milan).
- In anticipation of war, the U.S. government ordered the wives and children of U.S. officials in Egypt and Israel to leave within 48 hours.
- Born: Poppy Z. Brite (Billy Martin), transgender American gothic horror novelist; in New Orleans

== May 26, 1967 (Friday) ==
- President Nasser addressed the congress of Arab Trade Unionists in Cairo and declared that Egypt and the other Arab nations were now prepared to destroy Israel. "We've been waiting for the day when we are ready for battle," he said, noting "recently we have felt our strength is sufficient." The threat came a moment later when he said, "The struggle with Israel will be total; its basic goal will be the destruction of Israel. I would not say this five or even three years ago. Today I say it because I'm certain of it." At the same time, the Egyptian Air Force was again "ordered not to launch the first strike."
- The Araniko Highway through Nepal, linking Nepal's capital of Kathmandu with the border town of Kodari on Nepal's border with Tibet and China, was dedicated in a ceremony by King Mahendra Bir Bikram. Construction of the 65-mile-long (105 km) highway had been financed by the People's Republic, which also paid for the Sino-Nepal Friendship Bridge; despite concerns in India that the road would facilitate an invasion by China, King Mahendra reportedly had told India's Prime Minister Nehru, "Communism will not arrive in Nepal via a taxi cab."
- The government of Israel ordered its ships to avoid challenging the Egyptian closing of the Strait of Tiran and specifically directed that any of its merchant vessels "must not, for the present, try to run the blockade declared by Cairo". The decision closed off Israel's supply of oil from the Persian Gulf. At the same time, President Nasser of Egypt said that if the closing of the Gulf of Aqaba meant war, "it will be total and the objective will be to destroy Israel."
- The 12-team United Soccer Association (USA) played its very first game, with foreign teams competing under different names in American and Canadian cities. Play opened at Washington, D.C. as the Cleveland Stokers (Stoke City F.C. of England) visited the Washington Whips (Aberdeen F.C. of Scotland). Maurice Setters of the Stokers scored the first USA goal, and Cleveland defeated Washington, 2–1 before a crowd of 9,403.
- The Beatles released their iconic album Sgt. Pepper's Lonely Hearts Club Band, which appeared on the Parlophone label in the United Kingdom that day, and would be released on June 2 in the United States. It would be the number one best selling album in the United Kingdom for 27 weeks, and number one in the United States for 15 weeks.

== May 27, 1967 (Saturday) ==
- In a referendum in Australia, voters overwhelmingly (90.77%) approved the removal of two provisions in the Australian Constitution that allowed discrimination against the indigenous Aborigines. "Ever since," an author would note later, "the 1967 referendum has popularly been memorialized as the moment when Aboriginal people gained equal rights with other Australians, even won the right to vote. In fact, the referendum did not achieve those outcomes." The final total was 4,737,701 voting "yes", 478,931 voting "no".
- The aircraft carrier USS John F. Kennedy was christened by the late President's 9-year-old daughter, Caroline Kennedy, in ceremonies at Newport News, Virginia, before a crowd of 32,000 people that included President Johnson and most of Kennedy's White House staff and his relatives. The event was so anticipated that all three American television networks interrupted their regular Saturday morning cartoon programming for live coverage, starting at 11:30 a.m. Eastern time.
- Egypt and Israel were both prepared to go to war on May 27. The Soviet Ambassador to Egypt called President Nasser at 3:00 that morning and asked him to not make the first strike and, after U.S. President Johnson requested restraint to prevent a possible Soviet intervention in the Middle East, an Israeli cabinet resolution on whether to attack Egypt failed because of a 7 to 7 deadlock.
- On the same day that Nigeria's President Gowon declared a state of emergency and ordered the reorganization of the nation into 12 states, the legislature of the oil rich Eastern Region of Nigeria, declared independence as the Democratic Republic of Biafra, with its capital at Enugu. The military governor of the Eastern Region was Nigerian Army Lt. Colonel Odumegwu Ojukwu.
- Forty-three people in India were killed when the bus they were in left the highway near Tiruchirappalli in Tamil Nadu state, and sank in a deep pond.
- The folk rock band Fairport Convention played their first gig, with a concert at St. Michael's Hall in Golders Green, North London.
- Born:
  - Paul Gascoigne, English soccer football midfielder and England national football team player; in Gateshead, County Durham
  - Kai Pflaume, German TV game show host and presenter; in Halle, East Germany

== May 28, 1967 (Sunday) ==
- Israel received a communication from U.S. President Johnson at 11:00 in the morning Israeli time, advising that the Soviet Union had informed the U.S. that if Israel started military action, the Soviets would "extend help to the attacked states", and urged that he would advise that "Israel just must not take pre-emptive military action". At 3:00, the cabinet held a meeting and voted to wait an additional two to three weeks to allow the international community to reopen the Straits of Tiran before launching a preemptive conventional attack against its neighbors. Israel's government then made the decision "to cross the nuclear threshold and assemble nuclear devices" at its nuclear research facility at Dimona. With the exception of Transportation Minister Moshe Carmel, the cabinet vote had been almost unanimous. Prime Minister Levi Eshkol went on the radio at 8:30 p.m. local time to deliver what would be called an "ill-fated address" that "had a detrimental impact on morale" as he tried to explain the government's decision to wait.
- Sailing in his 54-foot yacht, Gipsy Moth IV, 65-year old Sir Francis Chichester completed his round-the-world voyage, sailed into England's Plymouth Harbour, where he was greeted with cheers from 250,000 spectators. After docking, he "set a firm foot on dry land for the first time in four months". Chichester had departed Plymouth on August 27 and stopped only at Sydney, Australia.
- The government of Malaysia announced that, starting September 1, it would ignore any letters that were not written in the Malay language.

== May 29, 1967 (Monday) ==
- Pope Paul VI named 27 Roman Catholic archbishops to the rank of cardinal, bringing the total number to 120. The 27 were 13 Italians, four Americans, three French, and one each from Poland, West Germany, Switzerland, the Netherlands, Bolivia, Argentina and Indonesia. All 27 would be formally elevated on June 26 in Rome. The new cardinal from Poland was the Archbishop of Kraków, Karol Wojtyla, who would, in 1978, become Pope John Paul II. Biographer Garry O'Connor would later write that the appointment came a year after Polish leader Wladyslaw Gomulka had blocked the Pope from visiting for the 1966 millennial celebration of Christianity in Poland, and that "Paul took his revenge on Gomulka, if popes may be said to do this."

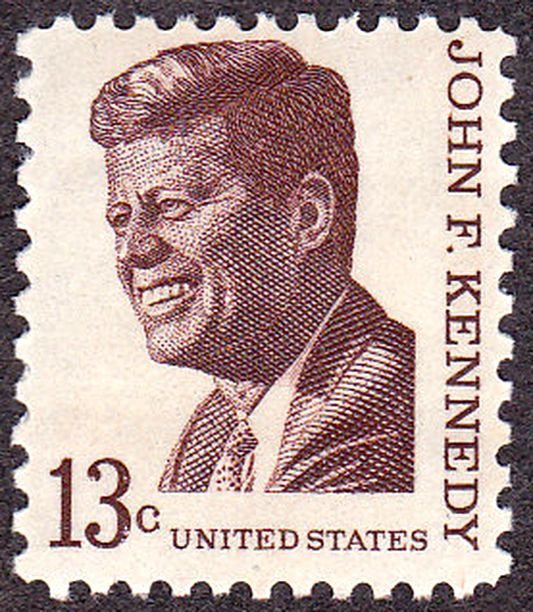

- What would have been John F. Kennedy's 50th birthday was honored by the issuance of a new, 13-cent postage stamp bearing the late President's likeness. Because of the Memorial Day holiday, U.S. post offices were not open.
- NASA's Langley Research Center (LaRC) selected Northrop Ventura Company to conduct research for a flexible parawing for potential use spacecraft landings. As opposed to a parachute, a parawing could potentially allow controlled descent in a shallow glide and offer wide flexibility in choosing a site for a soft landing. The parawing was to be evaluated for possible use on Apollo missions by the early 1970s. An actual landing of a crewed U.S. spacecraft would not take place until 1981 by the Space Shuttle Challenger.
- Born: Noel Gallagher, English rock musician and guitarist for Oasis; in Manchester
- Died: G. W. Pabst, 81, Austrian theater and film director

== May 30, 1967 (Tuesday) ==
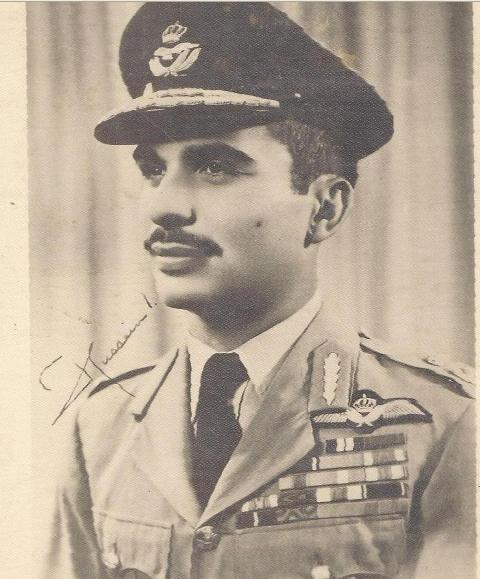
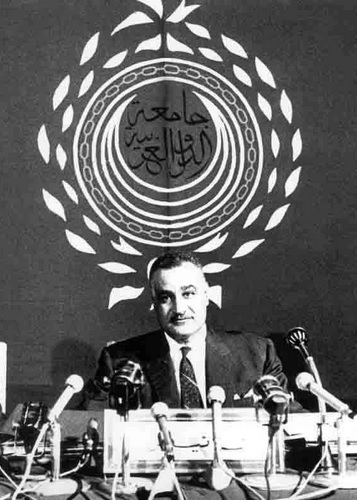
King Hussein and President Nasser
- In Cairo, King Hussein of Jordan made the fateful decision to sign a five-year mutual defense pact with Egypt, placing Jordan's regular army, the Arab Legion, under President Nasser's command in the event of a war with Israel. Israeli Foreign Minister Abba Eban would say later that King Hussein's trip to Cairo was "the final step that ensured the inevitability of war", and that until then, Israel had planned to leave Jordan (including the West Bank and East Jerusalem) out of the conflict. Eban would write that "Hussein had now thoughtlessly renounced this immunity."
- At 2:00 in the morning, Lt. Colonel Odumegwu Ojukwu of the Nigerian Army addressed civilian and military leaders, diplomats, and journalists at the State House in the regional capital of Enugu and announced that he was proclaiming "that the territory and region known as and called Eastern Nigeria, together with her continental shelf and territorial waters, shall henceforth be an independent and sovereign state of the name and title of the Republic of Biafra." An announcement on the radio followed three hours later to the 14,000,000 residents "whose lives would soon be ravaged by one of the most violent conflicts in African history."
- On the small West Indies island of Anguilla, local residents who were angry about the assignment of their colony to the administration of neighboring Saint Kitts and Nevis invaded police headquarters in the island's capital, The Valley, and fired the 13 policemen from St. Kitts and the resident colonial administrator, Vincent F. Byron. Byron and the police were sent back to St. Christopher on a boat the next day. "This 'act of revolution'", a writer would note later, "was dealt with in typically heavy-handed fashion by the British government".
- At the United States Penitentiary outside of Lewisburg, Pennsylvania, according to FBI files, an inmate informer reportedly heard former Teamsters Union boss Jimmy Hoffa tell two other inmates that he had arranged a contract for murder on Senator Robert F. Kennedy and that Hoffa said "if he ever gets in the primaries or ever gets elected, the contract will be fulfilled within six months." Kennedy would be assassinated a little more than a year later after winning the California presidential primary.
- Died: Claude Rains, 77, British actor who starred in films such as The Invisible Man (1933), Casablanca (1942) and Lawrence of Arabia (1962)

== May 31, 1967 (Wednesday) ==
- The first Black Shield operation, reconnaissance photography from 80,000 feet (24,000 m) of surface-to-air missile (SAM) sites in North Vietnam by Lockheed A-12 jets, was performed by U.S. Air Force pilot Mel Vojvodich. He took off from Kadena Air Base at Okinawa, refueled at 25,000 feet (7,600 m), then flew over Haiphong, Hanoi and Dien Bien Phu, refueled again over Thailand, then flew over the area above the DMZ, photographing 70 of the 190 known SAM bases.
- Born:
  - Phil Keoghan, New Zealand-born American TV host of The Amazing Race; in Lincoln, Selwyn District
  - Kenny Lofton, American major league outfielder and stolen base leader; in East Chicago, Indiana
- Died: Billy Strayhorn, 51, American jazz composer, died from esophageal cancer
