= Arnold Zenker =

Arnold Zenker (August 23, 1938 – April 5, 2026) was an American media broadcaster and public appearance counselor, who gained national attention as a 28 year old CBS News executive by sitting in for Walter Cronkite on the nightly Evening News during an American Federation of Television and Radio Artists (AFTRA) strike in April, 1967. Newsweek hailed his performance as "the smash hit of the strike fill-in." When the walkout ended thirteen days later, Cronkite returned with the words "Good Evening. This is Walter Cronkite sitting in for Arnold Zenker. It's good to be back". Zenker then resumed his regular position as Manager of News Programming.

Five months later, Zenker left CBS to become the anchor of the 6 p.m. newscast at WBZ-TV in Boston. In 1969, he became host of a live hour long daily talk-variety program at WJZ-TV in Baltimore, which became the highest rated show in its time slot. During that period, he also did a four hour a day talk stint on WAYE Radio. In 1972, he returned to Boston to host a daily day time program, and a weekly prime time show called The Zenker Hearings. on WCVB-TV.

In 1974, Zenker founded one of the first media consulting firms in the country, coaching corporate executives, government officials and political candidates how to best manage their public appearances. Becoming Zenkerized became a familiar slogan in the business world. Among company clients were Fidelity Investments, CSX Corporation, Sun Oil, the National Federation of Independent Business and organizations in Great Britain, Mexico, Canada and Israel. Mike Wallace profiled Zenker on 60 Minutes as the man who helps business put "a good face on bad facts,"and Dodd-Mead published his book Mastering the Public Spotlight.

Zenker received both his undergraduate and law degrees from the University of Pennsylvania, and was a member of both the Massachusetts and New York Bars.

Zenker died on April 5, 2026, at the age of 87.
