= Walter Bortz II =

American physician (1930–2023)

Walter Bortz
- Born: March 20, 1930; Philadelphia, Pennsylvania, U.S.
- Died: August 5, 2023 (aged 93); Portola Valley, California, U.S.
- Education: Williams College; University of Pennsylvania School of Medicine
- Occupation: Professor of Medicine at Stanford University
- Known for: Expertise on Aging and Diabetes

Walter Michael Bortz II (March 20, 1930 – August 5, 2023) was an American physician and author who taught medicine at Stanford University. He conducted research on aging and promoted the possibility of a 100-year lifespan.

== Education ==
Bortz attended the Episcopal Academy of Philadelphia in 1947. He graduated from Williams College with a B.A. cum laude in 1951 and graduated from the University of Pennsylvania School of Medicine in 1955.

== Career ==
Bortz was co-chairman of the American Medical Association's Task Force on Aging, past President of The American Geriatrics Society and was Chairman of the Medical Advisory Board for the Diabetes Research and Wellness Foundation.

His research focused on the importance of physical exercise during the process of aging. Bortz wrote 150 scientific articles for research publications such as JAMA, Annals of Internal Medicine, and Journal of Biological Chemistry, as well as articles in The New York Times, Washington Post, San Francisco Chronicle, The New England Journal of Medicine, American Journal of Public Health, and Town & Country.

Bortz wrote eight books including We Live Too Short and Die Too Long, Dare to be 100, Living Longer for Dummies, Diabetes Danger, Next Medicine, and Occupy Medicine. As of 2018 he was working on his ninth, tentatively titled Aging is Negotiable.

== Personal life and death ==
Bortz was the son of Ed Bortz, former president of the American Medical Association. Bortz lived in Portola Valley, California. He had four children and nine grandchildren.

A runner for several decades, Bortz ran over 10 miles per week and has finished in over 30 marathons, including the New York and Boston marathons.

Bortz died at his Portola Valley home on August 5, 2023, at the age of 93.

== Awards ==
- Paavo Nurmi Award, Runners World Magazine 1986
- University of California, San Francisco - Institute for Health & Aging, Distinguished Leadership Award 1990
- Kenneth Cooper Award for Scientific Contribution to Active Living George Sheehan Award - National Fitness Leader's Association 1996
- American Society on Aging, Presidential Award 2002
- Avenidas Lifetime Achievement Award, Palo Alto, CA 2007
