= Sunset Boulevard (disambiguation) =

Sunset Boulevard is a celebrated street in western Los Angeles County, California.

Sunset Boulevard or Sunset Blvd may also refer to:

== Other places ==
- Sunset Boulevard, a district of the Disney's Hollywood Studios
- Sunset Boulevard, a thoroughfare running north–south through the Sunset District of San Francisco, California

== Film ==
- Sunset Boulevard (film), a 1950 film starring Gloria Swanson and William Holden
  - Sunset Boulevard (film score), the score for the 1950 film

== Theatre ==
- Sunset Boulevard (musical), an Andrew Lloyd Webber musical adapted from the 1950 film

== Music ==
- "Sunset Blvd" (Scott Grimes song), 2005
- "Sunset Blvd" (Selena Gomez and Benny Blanco song), 2025
- "Sunset Boulevard", a song from the album City Boy by City Boy
- Sunset Blvd. (album), Yancey Boys album
- Sunset Boulevard EP, 1994 release by Luke Vibert
- Sunset Boulevard, Elvis Presley compilation album from 2025

== Business ==
- Sunset Boulevard (restaurant), Danish fast food chain
