= February 1967 =

Month of 1967

<<	February 1967					>>
Su	Mo	Tu	We	Th	Fr	Sa
			1	2	3	4
5	6	7	8	9	10	11
12	13	14	15	16	17	18
19	20	21	22	23	24	25
26	27	28

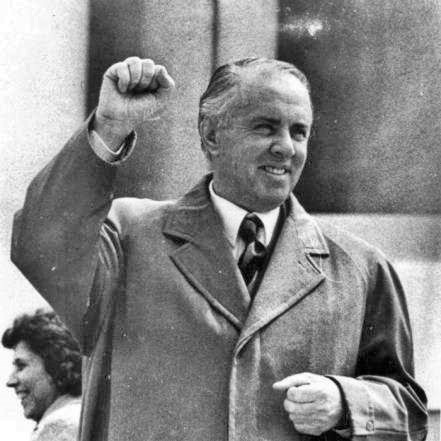
February 6, 1967: Enver Hoxha announces plan to make Albania the world's first "atheist state"

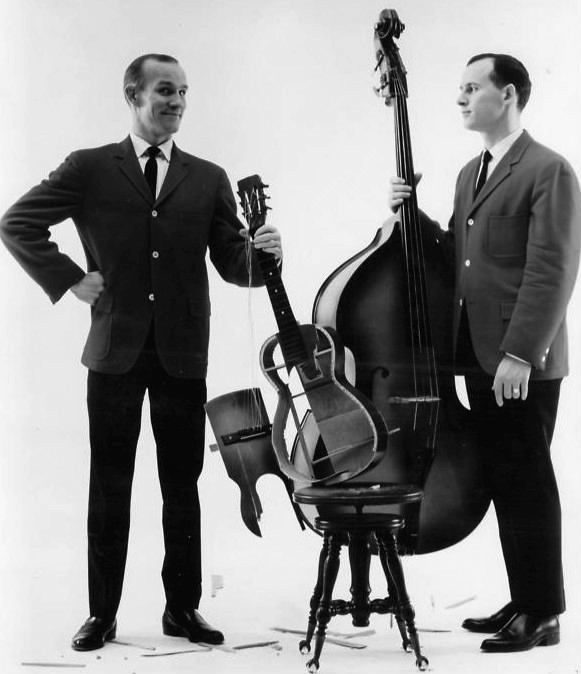
February 5, 1967: The Smothers Brothers transform TV comedy

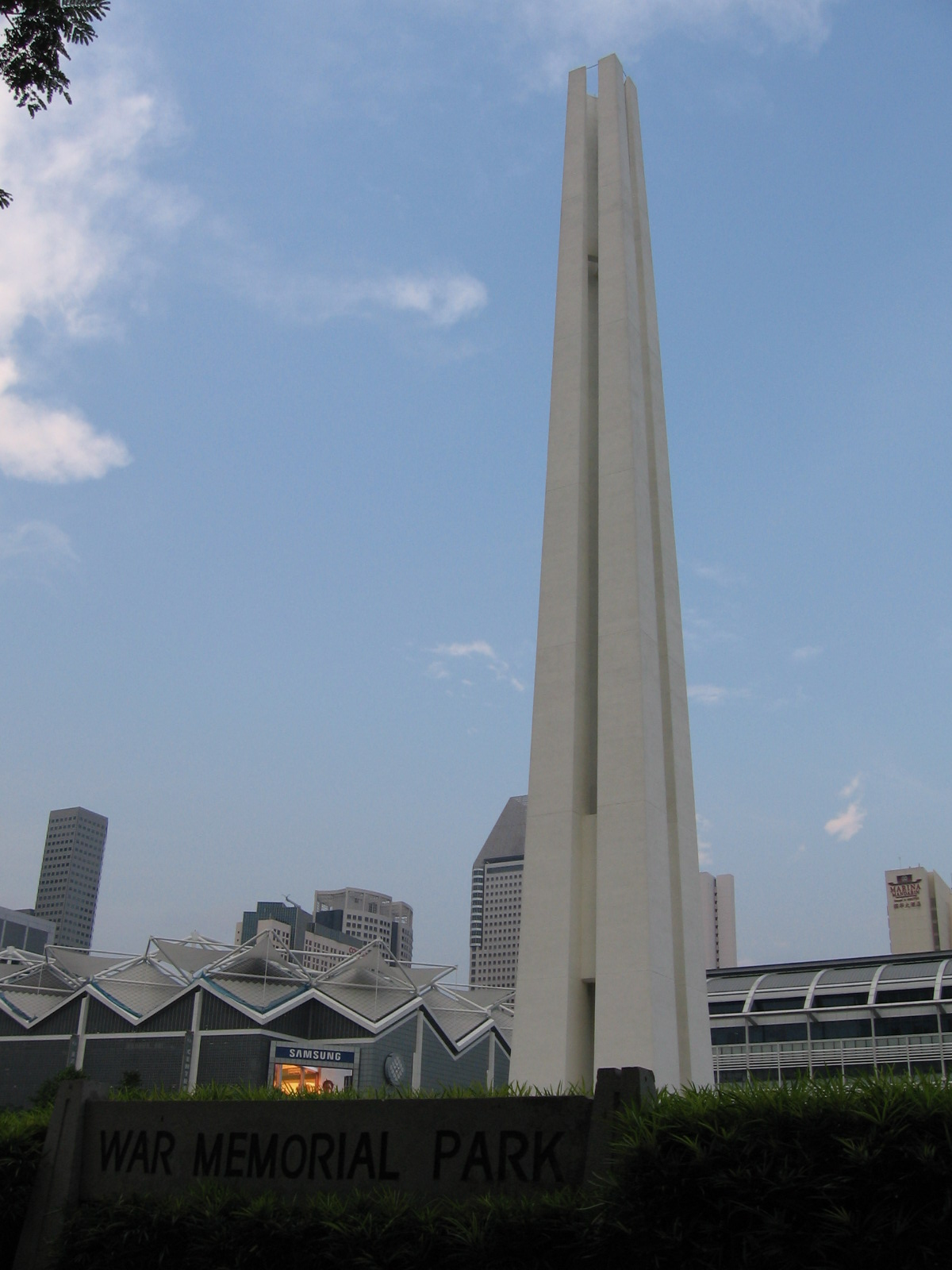
February 15, 1967: "The Chopsticks" dedicated in Singapore

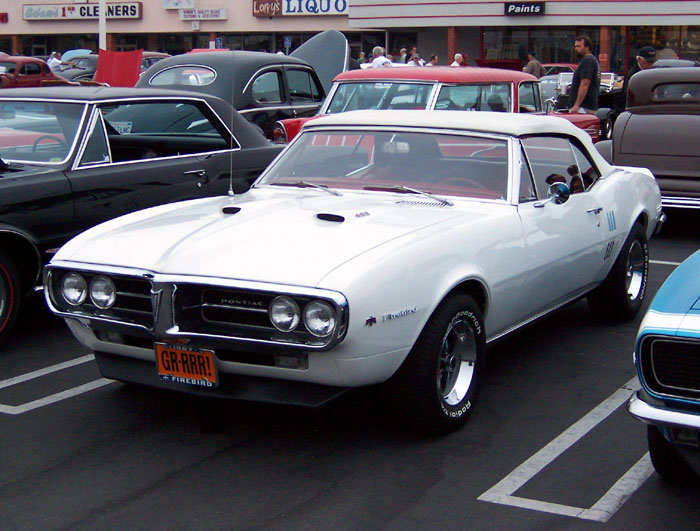
February 23, 1967: The Pontiac Firebird introduced

The following events occurred in February 1967:

== February 1, 1967 (Wednesday) ==
- The federal minimum wage in the United States increased from $1.25 an hour to $1.40 an hour for 30,000,000 workers. An additional 8,000,000 workers in retail work, hotels, restaurants, construction, laundries and hospitals were guaranteed at least $1.00 an hour, to increase to $1.60 by 1971, and 400,000 farm workers were covered by minimum wage for the first time as a new law took effect.
- The British rock group Pink Floyd got its first professional recording contract when it was signed by EMI.
- Jefferson Airplane released their second studio album, Surrealistic Pillow, to critical success. The album is considered to be one of quintessential works to the psychedelic rock and 1960s counterculture eras.
- A the opening of the final two-day Gemini Summary Conference at NASA's Manned Spacecraft Center, MSC Director Robert R. Gilruth announced that the Gemini Program Office was abolished, but that wrapping up the program would require several years of gradually decreasing effort. The conference featured presentation of 22 papers on the results of the final Gemini missions, and discussion of orbital rendezvous and docking operations, extravehicular activities, operational experience, and the results of experiments carried aboard the Gemini missions.
- Born: Meg Cabot, American novelist best known for her books in The Princess Diaries series; in Bloomington, Indiana

== February 2, 1967 (Thursday) ==
- At a press conference in New York, California lawyer Gary Davidson announced the formation of the 10-team American Basketball Association, set to be a competitor to the 10-team National Basketball Association. Former NBA star George Mikan was introduced as the first ABA Commissioner. The ten franchises identified were Indianapolis, Minneapolis, New Orleans, New York and Pittsburgh in an eastern division, and Anaheim, Dallas, Houston, Kansas City, and Oakland in a western division. Before the season opener, an 11th team would be added in Louisville, and the Kansas City franchise would be shifted to Denver.
- Bolivia's new constitution was approved by the Bolivian Constituent Assembly of 1966–67.

== February 3, 1967 (Friday) ==
- East Germany released four Americans who had been imprisoned in the Communist nation for more than a year and allowed them to cross into West Berlin without completing their full sentences, after negotiation between the city attorneys of both East and West Berlin, in cooperation with U.S. State Department officials. Mary Hellen Battle of Oak Ridge, Tennessee; Moses Herrin of Akron, Ohio; and Frederick Matthews of Ellwood City, Pennsylvania had been arrested in 1965 and charged with helping East Germans escape to the west, while William Lovett of San Francisco had been jailed in the same year after a traffic accident in Leipzig.
- At his recording studio in Holloway, North London, British record producer Joe Meek murdered his landlady, Violet Shenton, after she came by to collect his past due rent. He then committed suicide by shooting himself in the head. Meek was best known for composing the 1962 popular instrumental "Telstar"; he was 35, and Shenton was 52.
- Died: Ronald Ryan, 41, Australian convicted murderer, was hanged at Pentridge Prison in Melbourne, becoming the last man executed in Australia. On December 19, 1965, Ryan had killed George Hodson, a guard at the same prison, during an escape.

== February 4, 1967 (Saturday) ==
- The Chinese Communist Party issued its "Circular Concerning the Great Proletariat Cultural Revolution in Elementary Schools", instructing that all teachers and students must return to schools and that classes, suspended since June 1966, must start back after the end of the annual Spring Festival. Emphasis was placed on children studying the Little Red Book, Quotations from Chairman Mao. Schools would resume on March 20.
- Preparing for the possibility of a war between the Soviet Union and China, the Politburo of the Communist Party of the Soviet Union adopted a resolution to station troops in Mongolia, and to increase the Soviet military presence in the Soviet socialist republics bordering China.
- NASA launched the unmanned satellite Lunar Orbiter 3 at 8:17 in the morning from Florida (0117 February 5, UTC) on a mission to photograph the exact sites where crewed Moon missions would be able to land.
- The 1967 World Sportscar Championship season opened with the 24 Hours of Daytona. When the race finished the next day, the Italian Ferrari racers had finished in first, second and third place, with Chris Amon and Lorenzo Bandini alternating the driving duties on the winner. Only one of the six Ford Mark II cars finished the race, 300 miles (480 km) behind the first-place car.
- The German Democratic Republic (East Germany) made proposals for an informal agreement by Warsaw Pact representatives to support their position on West Berlin.
- Born: Sergei Grinkov, Soviet skater; in Moscow (d. 1995)

== February 5, 1967 (Sunday) ==
- General Anastasio Somoza Debayle was elected President of Nicaragua in a contest that his opponents said was marked by fraud, including the confiscation of ballot boxes in some precincts. As the son of one President and the brother of another, he was the third member of the powerful Somoza family to be declared President. According to official returns, Somoza won more than 70% of the vote, with 380,162 ballots, compared to 157,432 for the second-place finisher, Fernando Agüero.
- The Smothers Brothers Comedy Hour made its debut on the CBS television network. Hosted by 30-year old Tom Smothers and his 27-year-old brother Dick Smothers, the comedy variety show was a ratings success with the 15-to-24-year-old demographic, and would be renewed for a second season. From its September 1 season premiere onward, it would become more controversial because of its radical political and countercultural views and would be canceled on April 3, 1969.
- Zealous supporters of China's Communist Party Secretary Mao Zedong proclaimed the "Shanghai People's Commune", taking control of China's largest city government from the Shanghai communists and forming their own government, inspired by the Paris Commune of 1871. Zhang Chunqiao and Yao Wenyuan, half of the hated "Gang of Four", were proclaimed the Director and the Deputy Director of the Commune.
- Italy's first guided missile cruiser, the Vittorio Veneto, was launched.
- Born: Freddie Pitcher, Nauruan politician who briefly served as the President of Nauru in the second week of November, 2011

== February 6, 1967 (Monday) ==
- WBC world heavyweight boxing champion Muhammad Ali defeated the WBA's heavyweight champ, Ernie Terrell, at the Houston Astrodome. In the publicity leading up to the unification bout, Terrell had repeatedly used Ali's former name, Cassius Clay. Starting in the 8th round, Ali repeatedly shouted at Terrell, "What's my name? What's my name?" as he threw punches. The bout went the full 15 rounds, and Ali won in a unanimous decision. American newspapers remained divided about which name to use and sometimes compromised by using both in headlines. Ali would be stripped of both titles on April 28 for refusing induction into the U.S. Army.
- Albania's Communist Party chairman and de facto leader, Enver Hoxha, made a speech which he called "Programmatic Discourse against Religion and Backward Habits", beginning a campaign to make Albania what he called "the world's first atheist state". By the end of the year, 2,200 churches, mosques and other places of worship were closed or even burned down, clerics were arrested, and professing to have a particular faith was derided as "religious superstition".
- Soviet Premier Alexei Kosygin arrived in London to begin the first of five private conferences with British Prime Minister Harold Wilson.
- Born: Izumi Sakai, popular Japanese female recording artist (d. 2007); in Kurume, Fukuoka
- Died:
  - Martine Carol, 46, French film actress described as "a French version of America's Marilyn Monroe", died of a heart attack hours after filming scenes for her final movie, Bernard Knowles's Hell is Empty.
  - Henry Morgenthau Jr., 76, U.S. Secretary of the Treasury from 1934 to 1945 during the Great Depression and World War II.

== February 7, 1967 (Tuesday) ==
- A fire killed 25 people at an upscale restaurant located on the 11th floor of a hotel in Montgomery, Alabama. About 75 diners and employees were at Dale's Penthouse Restaurant when a fire in the restaurant's cloakroom, "started in a laundry bag apparently by a discarded cigarette or match". During the minutes that it took to locate a fire extinguisher, the flames spread across the thick and flammable carpeting. Many of the dead ignored smoke until they were unable to escape. The Alabama State Legislature would later vote to honor the restaurant's African-American chef, Jesse Williams, and posthumously honor the restaurant's hostess, Rose Doane, for their heroism in directing guests to safety.
- Bushfires in the Australian state of Tasmania claimed 62 lives, destroyed more than 1,200 homes and 1,700 buildings, and burned 2,642.7 square kilometres (1,020 square miles) of land.
- The Chinese government announced that it could no longer guarantee the safety of Soviet diplomats outside the Soviet Embassy building in Beijing.
- The British National Front, an extreme right-wing political party, was founded at Caxton Hall in London.
- Mazenod College, Victoria, opened in Australia.
- Died: David Unaipon, 94, Indigenous Australian author and preacher of the Ngarrindjeri aboriginal nation; Unaipon's portrait would later be placed on the Australian fifty-dollar note.

== February 8, 1967 (Wednesday) ==
- Gough Whitlam defeated Dr Jim Cairns and Frank Crean to replace the retiring Arthur Calwell as leader of the federal Australian Labor Party. After getting 32 of the 68 votes on the first ballot (against 15 for Cairns, 12 for Crean and 9 for other candidates), Whitlam got a majority on the third ballot, with 39 votes, and 15 and 14 for Cairns and Crean, respectively. After nearly six years as Leader of the Opposition, Whitlam would become Prime Minister on the ALP's victory in 1972 elections.
- U.S. President Lyndon Johnson sent a letter to North Vietnam's President Ho Chi Minh, by way of Moscow, that began "Dear Mr. President: I am writing to you in the hope that the conflict in Viet Nam can be brought to an end," and outlining his proposal that "I am prepared to order a cessation of bombing against your country... as soon as I am assured that infiltration into South Viet Nam by land and by sea has stopped." President Ho would receive the message on February 10 and prepare a response.
- Born: Adelir Antônio de Carli, Brazilian Catholic priest who died during an attempted cluster ballooning flight on April 20, 2008; in Pelotas, Rio Grande do Sul

== February 9, 1967 (Thursday) ==
- In a telephone call Secretary of Defence Robert McNamara informed President Lyndon Johnson to inform him that the North Vietnamese were using the Tết holiday ceasefire to move significant military supplies down into South Vietnam and that the Joint Chiefs were recommending that the U.S. break the ceasefire to prevent this. Johnson met with the various personnel later that day and decided against the resumption of hostilities in Vietnam during the cease fire.
- Soviet Prime Minister Alexei Kosygin met Queen Elizabeth II in London, and was received at Buckingham Palace for a state dinner as one of 58 guests, marking the first time that a British monarch had received a Soviet leader. "In deference to Russian custom," it was reported later, "the men wore business suits and the women short dresses, instead of the white-tie-and-tails and ground-sweeping gowns traditionally seen at royal occasions."
- A 6.8 magnitude earthquake killed 98 people in Colombia, striking at 10:24 in the morning local time and lasting 90 seconds. Of the deaths, 52 happened in the city of Neiva. The village of Guacamayas, with 4,000 residents, was near the epicenter of the 90-second long quake and most of its buildings were destroyed.
- The nearly 50,000 American military troops, civilian U.S. government employees, and their families stationed in South Korea came under the primary jurisdiction of the Korean government for the first time since 1950. Since the time of the Korean War, U.S. authorities had retained exclusive jurisdiction over any criminal offenses committed by Americans against South Koreans.
- The first of seven victims of the "Kenosha Killings", a 17-year-old girl, disappeared after leaving her home to walk to a drugstore. All of the people murdered between 1967 and 1981 lived between 64th Street and 67th Street in Kenosha, Wisconsin, United States. All victims would disappear at or near an alley that ran between those streets. The serial killings would remain unsolved fifty years later.
- Cellist and performance artist Charlotte Moorman was arrested by New York police at the Filmmaker's Cinematheque, where she was playing Brahms' Lullaby as part of Nam June Paik's production, the Opera Sextronique. Moorman would receive a suspended sentence for indecent exposure because she played the cello in public while topless.

== February 10, 1967 (Friday) ==
- The Twenty-fifth Amendment to the United States Constitution, governing presidential succession and disability, was ratified. Nevada became the necessary 38th state to vote approval of the amendment, an hour after Minnesota had voted its approval. Earlier in the day, it appeared that North Dakota was 37th when its state house of representatives, and Minnesota appeared to have made the difference; until someone pointed out that the North Dakota state senate had expressed its approval by voice vote rather than the roll call vote required by state law. Nevada had actually ratified on February 8, then voted to retract its ratification the same day in order not to be the penultimate state, while North Dakota's voice vote had been designed to be voided if necessary; Montana and Ohio had also vied to be the 38th state until "This game of legislative chicken finally came to an end". As of 1992, North Dakota was one of three states (along with Georgia and South Carolina) that had never ratified the 25th Amendment.
- The U.S. Department of Defense announced that it would restrict burials at Arlington National Cemetery to veterans who had made a career of the military, with the only exception being Medal of Honor winners and "high government officials and their dependents". All other veterans were denied burial at Arlington until further notice because only 6,437 unused grave sites remained and there had been more than 7,000 people buried at Arlington in 1966. The restrictions were made to let the remaining sites last for three additional years, with plans for 60,000 new sites to be available at neighboring grounds at Fort Myer, Virginia by 1970.
- The Portuguese colony of Macao began returning people who had fled from the People's Republic of China, starting with five refugees picked up by local police.

== February 11, 1967 (Saturday) ==
- In the first counterattack by the Chinese People's Liberation Army against the student participants in China's Cultural Revolution, the "February Countercurrent" began as the 69th Army Corps recaptured the city of Baoding, restored Governor Liu Zihou to power, and jailed more than 1,000 members of the "August First" group of the Red Guards.
- Opposition party members in South Korea created the New Democratic Party, made up predominantly of members of the Democratic People's Party and smaller political groups.
- Burgess Ice Rise, lying off the west coast of Alexander Island, Antarctica, was first mapped by the British Antarctic Survey (BAS).
- Born:
  - Hank Gathers, American college basketball star who died of a heart attack during a game; in Los Angeles (d. 1990)
  - Paul McLoone, Irish radio producer and presenter; in Derry, Northern Ireland
- Died: A. J. Muste, 82, Netherlands-born American clergyman and peace activist

== February 12, 1967 (Sunday) ==
- The First Infantry Division of the U.S. Army carried out what the commanding officer of the chemical unit referred to as "the largest CS attack of the Vietnamese war, and possibly of any war", dropping 25,000 pounds (11,000 kg) of tear gas on Viet Cong targets. Eleven Chinook helicopters, each carrying thirty 55-US-gallon (210 L; 46 imp gal) drums of powdered CS, flew over the jungles of the Binh Duong Province and, at the rate of once every three seconds, dropped 80 pounds (36 kg) of tear gas onto the enemy. Expecting a firefight upon landing, the American troops found instead that most of Vo Minh Triet's guerrillas had left before the tear gas assault had started.
- In Chichester, West Sussex, British police raided "Redlands", the home of the Rolling Stones' Keith Richards, in the early hours of the morning following a tip-off about a party from the News of the World. No arrests were made at the time, but Richards, Mick Jagger and art dealer Robert Fraser would subsequently be convicted of possession of drugs. On June 29, Richards would be sentenced by Judge Leslie Block to one year in prison, and Jagger to three months, but both would be released pending an appeal; on July 31, the London Appeal Court would overturn both convictions.
- Born:
  - N. Ravikiran (Narasimhan Ravikiran), Indian musician and prodigy; in Mysore, Karnataka state
  - Hermione Norris, English television actress; in Paddington, London

== February 13, 1967 (Monday) ==
- The body of a 24-year-old Mexican man was found on the playground of the 97th Street School in Los Angeles, after falling 5,000 feet (1,500 m) from an airliner that had lowered its landing gear during its approach to the Los Angeles International Airport from Mexico City. School was not in session because of the holiday for Lincoln's Birthday, so it was unclear when the accident had happened. Humberto Garcia Gutierrez had been living in poverty in Las Granjas, a slum within the city of Chihuahua, and had stowed away in the wheel well of the jet. It was unclear whether Garcia was still alive after enduring the cold and the thin air at high altitudes.
- Brazil revised its currency in an effort to combat inflation. The "cruzeiro novo" (NCr) was worth 1,000 of the old cruzeiros; on May 15, 1970, the cruzeiro novo would revert to its old name as the cruzeiro. On February 28, 1986, a new "cruzado" (worth 1,000 of the 1970 cruzeiros and one million of the 1966 cruzeiros) would be issued; on August 1, 1993, the "cruzeiro real" (worth 1,000 cruzados or one billion of the 1966 cruzeiros) would be made. On July 1, 1994, the most recent monetary unit, the Brazilian real, would be introduced, worth 2,750 cruzeiros reales, or 2.75 trillion of the 1966 cruzeiros.
- Protests outside the Soviet Embassy to China in Beijing finally ended, after 19 days of large crowds posing a threat to diplomats from the Soviet Union. The Chinese government had cleared the crowds after nearly three weeks of encouraging the demonstrations. Charge d'affaires Yuri Razdukhov was able to leave the embassy compound for the first time in nearly three weeks, and drove to offer his condolences at the North Vietnamese Embassy, while other diplomats were able to make trips to the Foreign Ministry.
- The Beatles released the songs "Penny Lane" and "Strawberry Fields Forever" on the same 45-rpm record as a "double A-sided" single in the United States, with a release in the UK four days later. Both were about locations in Liverpool. Sales where the record was displayed as "Penny Lane" would make it be #1 in the U.S. for the week ending March 18, while its flip side would peak at #8.
- The United Kingdom and the Soviet Union reached an agreement in Moscow, with the USSR dropping its claims for British-held assets of the former Baltic Republics (Latvia, Lithuania and Estonia) in return for 500,000 pounds sterling worth of British manufactured goods. The UK would continue its policy of non-recognition of the Baltic annexation.
- American researchers discovered the Madrid Codices by Leonardo da Vinci in the National Library of Spain.
- Born: Carolyn Lawrence, American actress known for voicing Sandy Cheeks on SpongeBob SquarePants; in Baltimore, Maryland

== February 14, 1967 (Tuesday) ==
- The Treaty of Tlatelolco was signed in Mexico City by representatives of almost all of the nations of Latin America, agreeing to ban "the testing, use, manufacture, production or acquisition by any means or type" of nuclear weapons within their countries. However, Article 18 of the treaty (which would enter into force on April 22, 1968) specifically authorized the nations "to carry out explosions of nuclear devices for peaceful purposes".
- The United States resumed bombing of North Vietnam at 7:00 in the morning (Hanoi time).
- Born:
  - Stelios Haji-Ioannou, Greek-born British shipping and airline entrepreneur; in Athens
  - Bernie Moreno, Colombia-born American politician and businessman
  - Mark Rutte, Prime Minister of the Netherlands since 2010; in The Hague
- Died: Sig Ruman, 82, German-born American character actor

== February 15, 1967 (Wednesday) ==
- The 230-foot (70 m) tall Civilian War Memorial was dedicated in Singapore on the 25th anniversary of the February 15, 1942, fall of Singapore to Japanese invaders, commemorating the memory of the Chinese, Malayan, Indian, and Eurasian civilians who were killed during World War II. Prime Minister Lee Kuan Yew said in the dedication, "This piece of concrete commemorates an experience which, in spite of its horrors, served as a catalyst in building a nation out of the young and unestablished community of diverse immigrants. We suffered together. It told us that we share a common destiny. And it is through sharing such common experiences that the feeling of living and being one community is established." With four columns to represent the four ethnic groups honored, the monument is affectionately nicknamed "The Chopsticks".
- Ten people were killed, and 12 others injured, in a chain reaction explosion at an ammunition manufacturing plant near Texarkana, Texas. A few minutes before the scheduled 11:00 p.m. change of shifts, a 105-millimeter shell exploded while being handled by an assembly line worker and touched off the explosion of other shells in the area.
- In elections in the Netherlands, the Catholic People's Party (KVP) lost 8 seats, but retained a plurality, with 42 of the 150 available in the Tweede Kamer, the "second chamber" of the Dutch parliament.
- Died: Simeon Radev, 88, Bulgarian journalist and historiographer, author of the three-volume work The Builders of Modern Bulgaria

== February 16, 1967 (Thursday) ==
- Tan Zhenlin, one of the Vice Premiers of the People's Republic of China, lost his temper at a high-level session of the Chinese Communist Party at Huairen Hall in Beijing, and denounced the Cultural Revolution as "the cruelest struggle in Party history" and declaring that he would fight the ultraleftists even if it meant imprisonment or death. Two days later, Mao Zedong called a meeting of the CCP Politburo and criticized Tan and the officials who had agreed with him, then singled out Tan as the leader of the counter-revolutionaries. After losing his post, Tan was sent to mountains of the Guangxi autonomous region to do manual labor for the next six years. His reputation would finally be rehabilitated in 1980.
- Died:
  - Smiley Burnette (stage name for Lester Alvin Burnette), 55, American musician and film and television actor, died of leukemia. Burnette, a sidekick to Gene Autry in Western films, and later had a recurring role as a train engineer on the TV sitcom Petticoat Junction.
  - Léon Cantave, 56, Haitian Army general who briefly served as President of Haiti in 1957 after a coup in the spring of that year.

== February 17, 1967 (Friday) ==
- "Fine Structure of RNA Codewords Recognized by Bacterial, Amphibian, and Mammalian Transfer RNA", authored by Marshall Nirenberg, Richard E. Marshall and C. Thomas Caskey, was published by the American Association for the Advancement of Science in its weekly magazine, Science, revealing their discovery that genetic code is universal and that the same messenger RNA (mRNA) nucleotides encoded proteins in all biological systems.
- Investigative reporter David Snyder of the New Orleans States-Item published the front-page story, "DA Here Launches Full JFK Death 'Plot' Probe", revealing that the city's district attorney, Jim Garrison, had spent more than $8,000 in travel expenses for three staff members in order to investigate the 1963 assassination of President John F. Kennedy. Garrison would give the first of many press conferences the next day.
- Born: Roberto Sighel, Italian speed skater; in Trento
- Died: Ciro Alegría, 57, Peruvian journalist

== February 18, 1967 (Saturday) ==
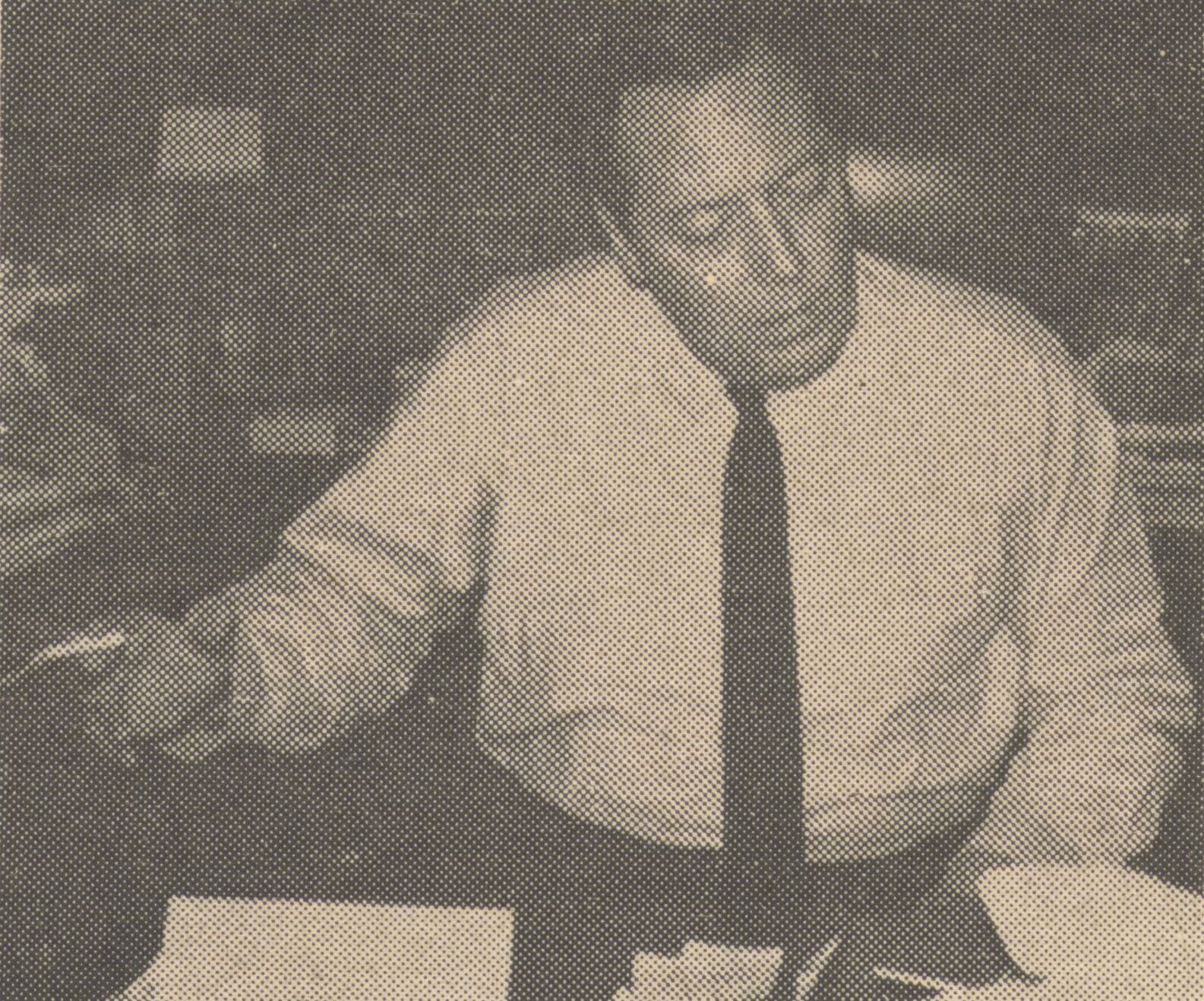
Jim Garrison

- New Orleans District Attorney Jim Garrison announced at a press conference that he believed that the assassination of John F. Kennedy had been a conspiracy, and that his office had been working on seeking an indictment over "the possible role of some individuals in New Orleans", adding that "arrests will be made."
- Nazi war criminal Franz Stangl was arrested in Brazil, where he had been working as an engineer in a Volkswagen factory since 1951 using his own name. Simon Wiesenthal, an Austrian survivor of Germany's concentration camps, had tracked Stangl down after nearly 18 years of searching. Hauptsturmführer (SS Captain) Stangl, who had been commandant of the Treblinka extermination camp, would be extradited to West Germany, where he would be tried and convicted for the murder of 900,000 Jews between 1941 and 1943. He would die in Düsseldorf prison on June 28, 1971, six months after being sentenced to life imprisonment.
- Born:
  - Tracey Edmonds, African American film and television producer; as Tracey Elaine McQuarn in Los Angeles
  - John Valentin, American baseball shortstop and 1995 Silver Slugger award winner; in Mineola, New York
  - Roberto Baggio, Italian footballer with 56 caps for the Italy national team as a striker; in Caldogno

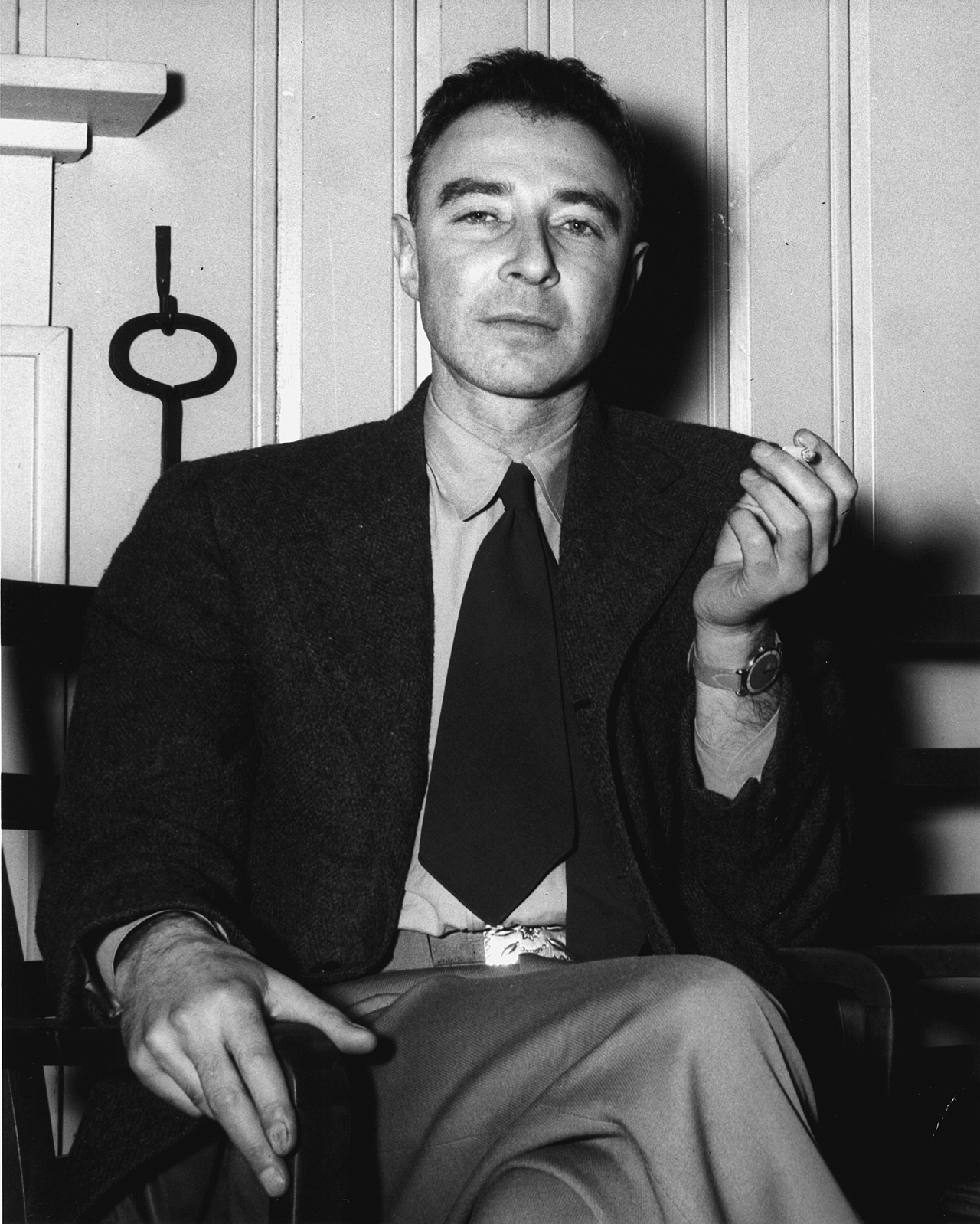
Dr. Oppenheimer

- Died: J. Robert Oppenheimer, 62, American atomic physicist, died of throat cancer. A biographer would write of him, "More than any other man, he was responsible for issuing American theoretical physics from a provincial adjunct of Europe to world leadership."

== February 19, 1967 (Sunday) ==
- The American space probe Lunar Orbiter 3 sent back the most detailed pictures up to that time of the far side of the Moon, not visible from the Earth. "By 1970," an author would note later, "the far side of the Moon had been as accurately mapped as the visible face." The Soviet Union had previously sent photographs (on October 7, 1959, from Luna 3) and on July 20, 1965, from Zond 3 The Lunar Orbiter 3 photos revealed chains of craters, hundreds of kilometers in length but, unexpectedly, no mare plains like those visible from Earth with the naked eye. In 1967, the second part of the Atlas of the Far Side of the Moon was published in Moscow, based on data from Zond 3, with the catalog now including 4,000 newly discovered features of the lunar far side landscape. In the same year, the first Complete Map of the Moon (1:5000000 scale) and updated complete globe (1:10000000 scale), featuring 95 percent of the lunar surface, were released in the Soviet Union.
- A rainfall of 7 inches (180 mm) in 24 hours caused landslides in Brazil in the bay cities of Rio de Janeiro and Niterói that washed away hundreds of hillside homes. The death toll in the slums of Juramento, Cavalcante, and Santa Teresa was at least 224.
- Operation Bribie, which culminated in the Battle of Ap My An, began in the Vietnam War.
- Born: Benicio del Toro, Puerto Rican film, television actor, and winner of the Academy Award for Best Supporting Actor for his role in the film Traffic; in San Germán, Puerto Rico

== February 20, 1967 (Monday) ==
- In Indonesia, President Sukarno signed an order relinquishing all of his remaining presidential powers, though not his title, to General Suharto. Sukarno had been the President of Indonesia since its independence in 1946. In the statement, released two days later on February 22, he wrote, "I, the President of Indonesia and Supreme Commander of the Armed Forces of the Republic of Indonesia, effective today, surrender executive power," adding that he was acting "for the sake of the people and the country." The statement, which came after a confrontation between armed forces commanders and Sukarno, was a compromise to avoid the prospect of a national hero being tried for treason for his role in a failed Communist coup in October 1965. Suharto had effectively been commander of the armed forces since March 1966.
- Jose Suarez, a resident of Brooklyn, New York, who had confessed to stabbing his common law wife and her five children to death in 1966, was freed and the charges were dismissed, because of the failure of interrogators to give him the Miranda warning, advising him of his right to an attorney. The prosecutor admitted that the state had no other evidence against Suarez, and Judge Michael Kern reluctantly dismissed the case, commenting that "This is a very sad thing. It is repulsive and makes one's blood run cold, to let a thing like this out on the street."
- Born:
  - Kurt Cobain, American musician, artist, and leader of the grunge rock band Nirvana; in Aberdeen, Washington (committed suicide, 1994)
  - Andrew Shue, American TV actor and activist; in Wilmington, Delaware
  - Lili Taylor, American film and television actress; in Glencoe, Illinois
  - David Herman, American comedian; in New York City

== February 21, 1967 (Tuesday) ==
- Voting concluded in India's five-day-long national parliamentary election for the Lok Sabha. The Indian National Congress party, led by Prime Minister Indira Gandhi, lost 78 seats but retained majority control, with 283 of the 520 available. In distant second was the Swatantra Party led by Chakravarti Rajagopalachari, with 8.67% of the vote and 26 seats overall. After three days of counting results, it was clear that the Congress party had lost its majority in the legislatures of five of India's 17 states, with only a plurality in Punjab, West Bengal and Rajasthan, and with opposition parties forming majority governments in Kerala and Tamil Nadu (referred to at the time as the Madras state. In addition, five of government ministers (for the ministries of railways, information, food, commerce, industry and housing) lost re-election and were forced to resign on February 24.
- The Australian Capital Territory was given full representation in Australia's House of Representatives, with the Member for the ACT being permitted to vote for the first time. Since 1948, the ACT had been represented by a non-voting observer. In 1973, the Territory would be split into two districts.
- The Jamaica Labour Party, led by Prime Minister Alexander Bustamante, gained seven seats to capture a majority (33 of 53) in the Jamaican House of Representatives in parliamentary elections.
- Apollo 1, first of the crewed Apollo space missions, had been scheduled for launch at 10:00 in the morning from Cape Kennedy in Florida, with astronauts Gus Grissom, Ed White and Roger B. Chaffee aboard for a 13-day orbital mission that would have ended on March 7. Instead, technicians at NASA were dismantling the charred remains of the Apollo Command Module that had been burned on January 27, along with the three astronauts. The only launch from NASA on this day was a small Arcas weather probe.
- Born: Neil Oliver, Scottish historian and TV presenter; in Renfrewshire

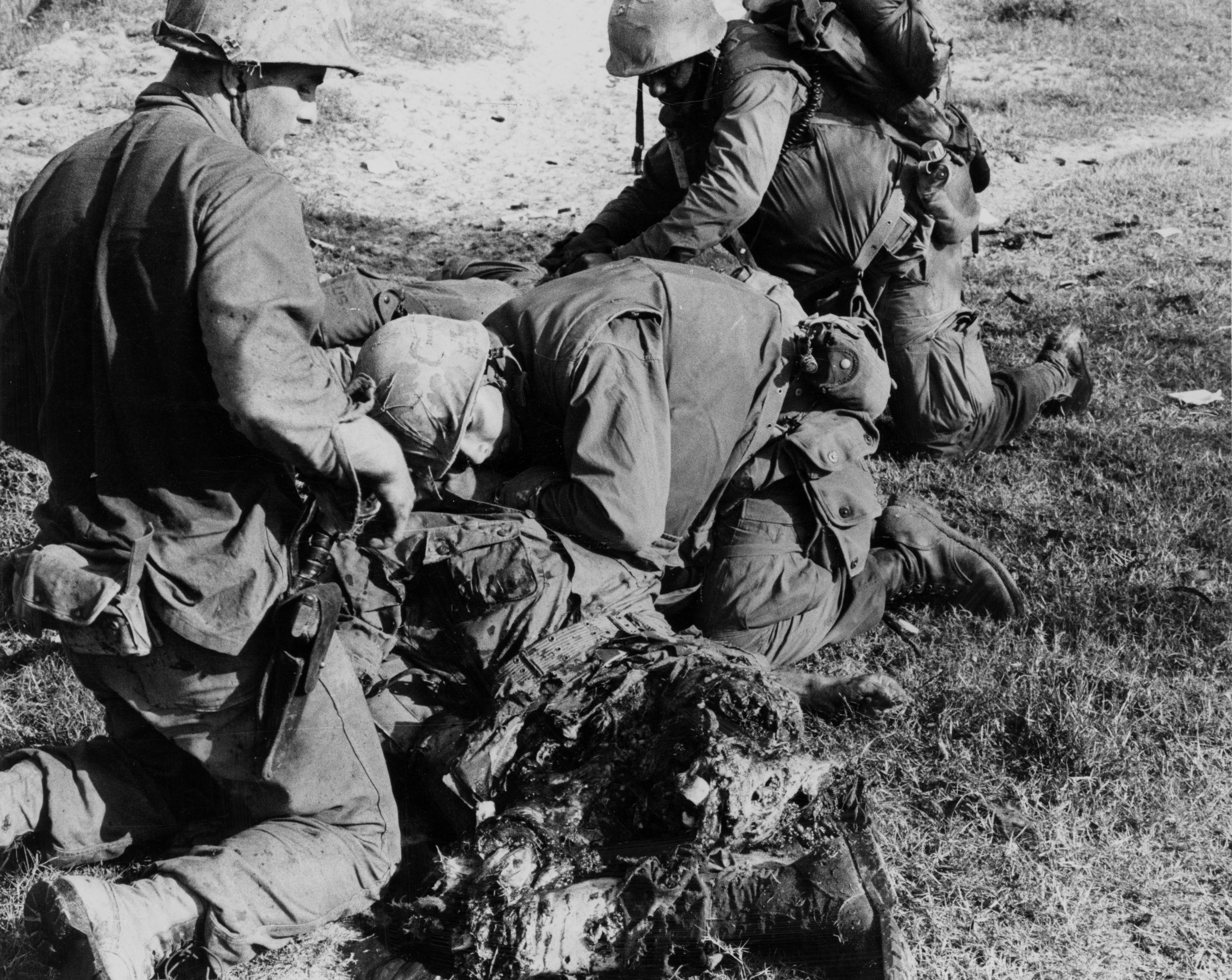
February 21, 1967: Corpsmen attempt to save Bernard B. Fall and Byron G. Highland

- Died:
  - Bernard B. Fall, 40, French-born American war correspondent and author of numerous books on war in Vietnam, was killed (along with a U.S. Marine) when he stepped on a land mine while taking photographs with a Marine patrol, 12 miles (19 km) north of Hue in South Vietnam.
  - Byron G. Highland, 33, U.S. Marine Corps combat photographer who was also killed alongside Bernard B. Fall by a land mine.
  - Charles Beaumont, 38, American science fiction author and scriptwriter for The Twilight Zone television series, died after an illness of several years.
  - Harry Lake, 55, New Zealand Minister of Finance since 1960, died of a heart attack.

== February 22, 1967 (Wednesday) ==
- The day after his political party won a majority in parliamentary elections, Alexander Bustamante, the popular Prime Minister of Jamaica, retired. Two years earlier, Bustamante had suffered a major stroke, but had continued to hold the office while Donald Sangster carried out most of the duties of the office. Sangster, who was also serving as finance minister, foreign minister and defense minister was appointed as the new Prime Minister, but would hold the office only for a few weeks before suffering a cerebral hemorrhage, and would die on April 11, 1967.
- Died: David Ferrie, 48, was found dead in his New Orleans home only four days after Jim Garrison had announced his plans to indict alleged conspirators in the John F. Kennedy assassination. Ferrie had been a flying service operator who had been accused by Garrison of being a "get-away pilot" for participants. United Press International noted at the time that Ferrie was "at least the 14th person to die who had something to do, directly, indirectly, or by the slightest of connections, with the assassination of President Kennedy and its aftermath" in the 39 months since November 22, 1963.

== February 23, 1967 (Thursday) ==
- In Xining, the capital city of China's Qinghai Province, 169 civilians and four soldiers were killed in a violent confrontation when troops of the People's Liberation Army (who had been forced out by the Red Guards) came in to retake control of the city's newspaper and were confronted with angry (and unarmed) locals.
- The Pontiac Firebird, the first sports car from the Pontiac division of General Motors, was first introduced to the public, in a display at the Chicago Auto Show.
- Trinidad and Tobago became the first British Commonwealth nation to join the Organization of American States.

== February 24, 1967 (Friday) ==
- Albert DeSalvo, who had confessed to the 13 murders of women carried out by the "Boston Strangler", escaped from the Bridgewater State Hospital, a mental institution where he had been held after being tried and convicted for several rapes. DeSalvo and two other patients had located a key to unlock their rooms on the hospital's third floor, then climbed down an elevator shaft before getting outside and getting over an outside wall to freedom. The two other men, Fred Erickson and George Harrison, were recognized in a bar by an attorney for a state legislative committee that had investigated the hospital, and were persuaded to give up, while the FBI continued the search. DeSalvo was captured the next day in Lynn, Massachusetts, after one of his brothers tipped off police about his whereabouts. DeSalvo was wearing a U.S. Navy sailor suit that he had gotten at a surplus store, and was caught inside Simons' Uniforms, a store that sold police uniforms.
- New Orleans District Attorney Jim Garrison surprised reporters when he said at a news conference that, after he and his staff had investigated the Kennedy assassination, "We solved it weeks ago. There remains only the details of evidence, and there is no question about it. We have the names of everyone. We have all the details." Garrison made the statement after he met with a group of 50 local businessmen who had pledged $300 apiece to defray the expenses of the investigation.
- The Bee Gees signed a management contract with Robert Stigwood.
- Born: Brian Schmidt, American-born Australian physicist and Nobel laureate; in Missoula, Montana
- Died:
  - U.S. Air Force Captain Hilliard A. Wilbanks, 33, posthumous Medal of Honor winner, was killed while using his airplane to protect a South Vietnamese Army Rangers unit by repeatedly strafing "a well-concealed and numerically superior hostile force" of Viet Cong guerrillas "poised to ambush the advancing rangers."
  - Franz Waxman, 60, German-born American film composer and two-time Academy Award winner

== February 25, 1967 (Saturday) ==
- Civil rights leader Martin Luther King Jr. began speaking out at length against American involvement in the Vietnam War, starting with a speech in Los Angeles for The Nation Institute, titled "The Casualties of the War in Vietnam". Among the "casualties" that he referred to were "the Charter of the United Nations", "the principle of self-determination", "the Great Society" programs, "the humility of our nation", "the principle of dissent" and "the prospects of mankind's survival". "We still have a choice today," King said, "nonviolent co-existence or violent co-annihilation... It is still not too late to make the proper choice."
- Britain's second Polaris missile submarine, HMS Renown, was launched.
- Born: Nick Leeson, British stock trader whose speculative trading caused the collapse of the venerable Barings Bank in 1995; in Watford
- Died: Ginger Lamb, 54, American travel book author who, with her husband Dana Lamb, claimed to have discovered the "Lost City of the Mayas" during travels in Mexico in the 1940s

== February 26, 1967 (Sunday) ==
- The first interfaith religious service in Israel, the "Prayer for World Peace", was held at the Temple Mount, a holy site for Christianity, Judaism, and Islam, near Jerusalem. Conducting services were the Reverend Charles Greco, Roman Catholic Bishop of Alexandria, Louisiana; Rabbi Samuel Natan of the Jeshurun Synagogue of Jerusalem; and Sheik Taufiq Asaliya, the Qadi of Jaffa.
- Mario Andretti, the defending United States Auto Club champion in open-wheel car racing, won the crown jewel of stock car racing, the Daytona 500. Andretti, driving the #11 Ford, finished 22 seconds ahead of 1965 Daytona winner Fred Lorenzen in front of a crowd of 94,255 fans. The 1966 Daytona champion, Richard Petty, was forced to drop out of the race after 193 laps.
- Mohammad Natsir, a former Prime Minister of Indonesia and former leader of the banned Masyumi Party, founded the Dewan Dakwah Islamiyah Indonesia (DDII), the Islamic Preaching Council of Indonesia, in response to the growth of the Christian missionary movement on the nation's islands.
- Born: Kazuyoshi Miura, Japanese soccer football forward, known as "Kazu" with 89 appearances for the national team; in Shizuoka City
- Died: Carl J. Murphy, 78, African-American publisher who turned the Baltimore Afro-American into a national newspaper

== February 27, 1967 (Monday) ==
- The first armed robbery in Ireland since World War II took place when three masked men with revolvers entered a branch of the Royal Bank of Ireland in Drumcondra, Dublin and took 3,265 Irish pounds in cash. The crime surprised Ireland's police, the Garda Síochána. It "was greeted with public shock throughout Ireland" and marked a change in the society of a nation where the citizens had generally been law-abiding, and the crime rate had historically been low.
- The West Indies Act 1967, also known as the "Associated Statehood Act", gave British "associated state" status to the Crown Colony of Saint Christopher-Nevis-Anguilla, consisting of three British-administered Caribbean islands. The citizens of Anguilla, unhappy with being governed by the two more populated islands, would vote five months later to secede.
- The Protocol of Buenos Aires was signed by members of the Organization of American States (OAS) in the Argentine capital, creating the new OAS General Assembly to replace the less powerful "Inter-American Conference" that had deliberated over Western Hemisphere matters since the OAS creation in 1948.
- Wharlest Jackson, 37, American civil rights activist and treasurer of the Natchez, Mississippi branch of the NAACP, was killed when a car bomb, placed on the frame of his truck under the driver-side seat, exploded at approximate 8 p.m.
- The Netherlands government gave its support to the United Kingdom's efforts to become a member of the European Economic Community, referred to as the "Common Market".
- Born: Jonathan Ive, British software designer for Apple Corporation, for products including the iPhone, the iPod, the iPad, and the Apple Watch; in Chingford, London

== February 28, 1967 (Tuesday) ==
- President Johnson sent a message to the U.S. Senate, asking for the introduction of what would become the Public Broadcasting Act of 1967. "I am convinced," the President said, "that a vital and self-sufficient noncommercial television system will not only instruct, but inspire and uplift our people." The creation of the Corporation for Public Broadcasting would be signed into law on November 7 and would create public funding for the existing National Educational Television network. On October 5, 1970, the corporation would be sufficiently funded for the Public Broadcasting Service (PBS) to be created.
- Eben Dönges, the former Prime Minister of South Africa, was elected the nation's president by the Senate and the House of Assembly voting as one body. Dönges received 163 votes and Pieter van der Byl got 52. Dönges was scheduled to be inaugurated as the second President of South Africa on May 31. Less than three weeks before he was to take office, however, Dönges would be stricken by a cerebral hemorrhage and would die without being sworn into office.
- At Stechford, Birmingham, a Manchester-Coventry four-carriage Class 304 electric unit collided with a Class 24 diesel locomotive at about 60 miles per hour (97 km/h), killing the driver and eight passengers, and injuring another 16 people.
- Died: Henry Luce, 68, American publisher and editor who created Time, Life, Fortune and Sports Illustrated magazines
