= March 1967 =

Month of 1967

<<	March 1967					>>
Su	Mo	Tu	We	Th	Fr	Sa
			1	2	3	4
5	6	7	8	9	10	11
12	13	14	15	16	17	18
19	20	21	22	23	24	25
26	27	28	29	30	31

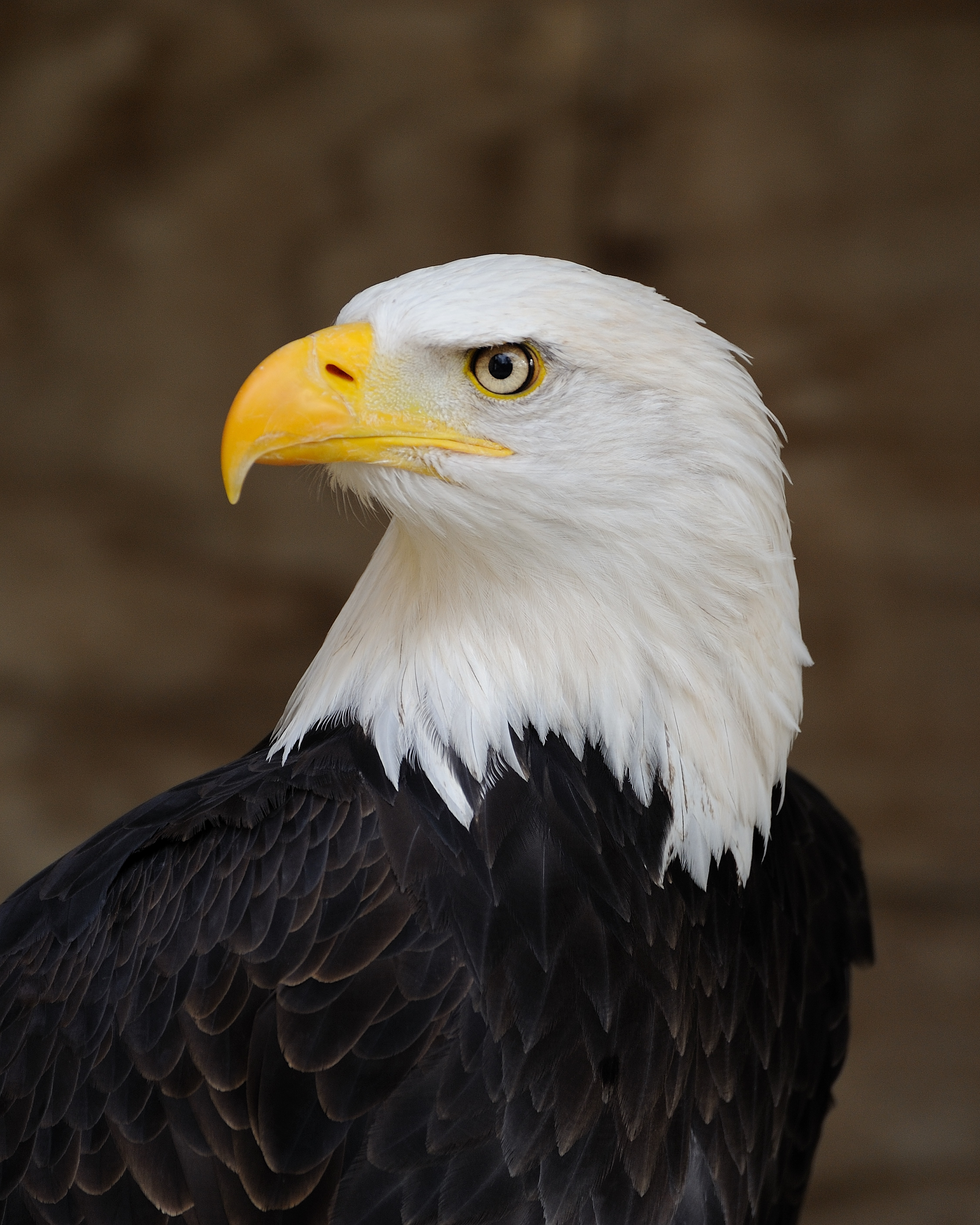
March 11, 1967: American national symbol placed on the endangered species list

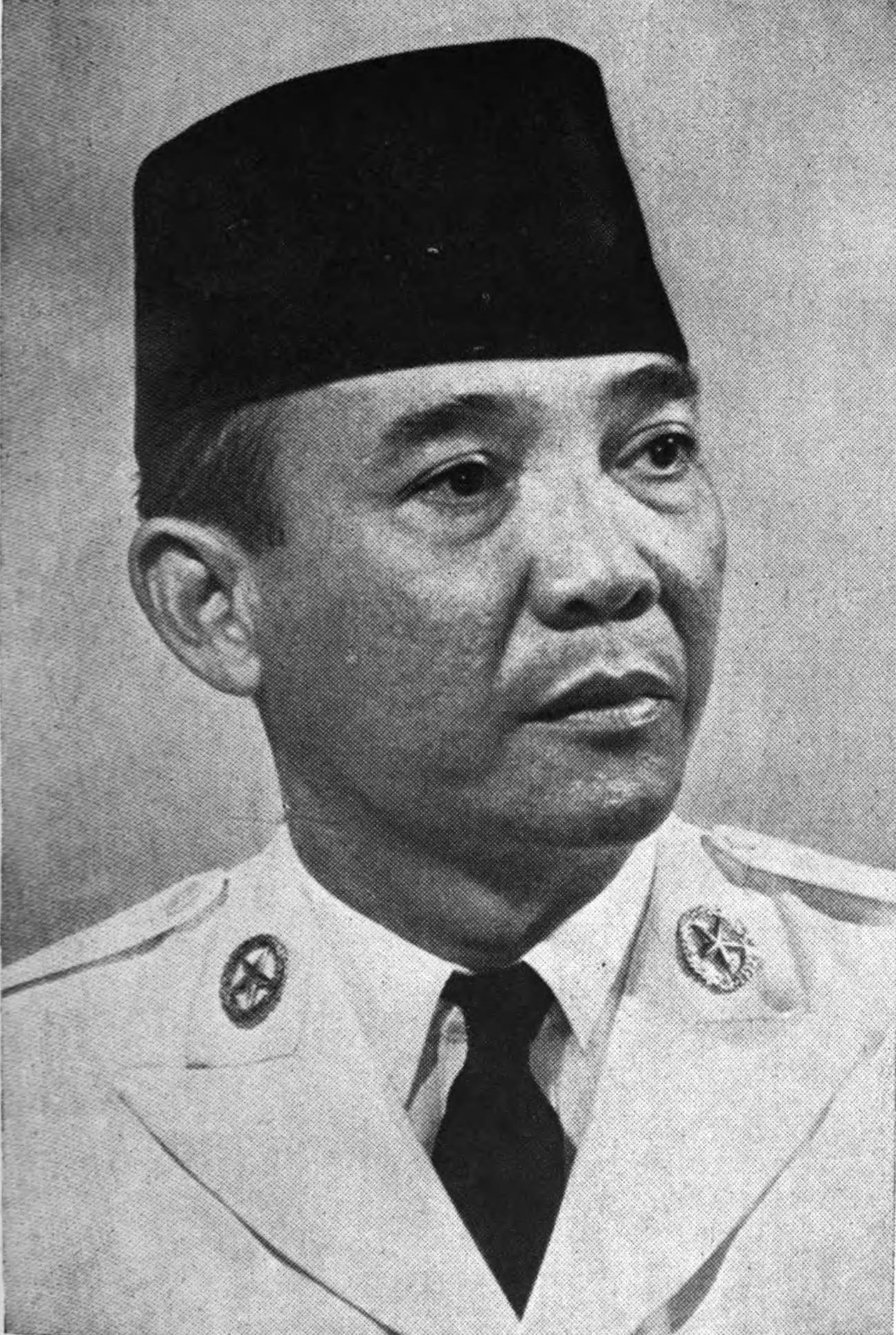
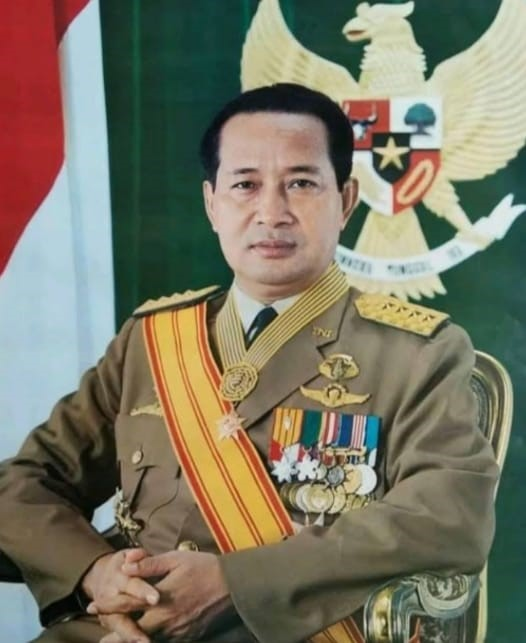
March 12, 1967: Indonesia's founder, Sukarno, removed from office and replaced by General Suharto

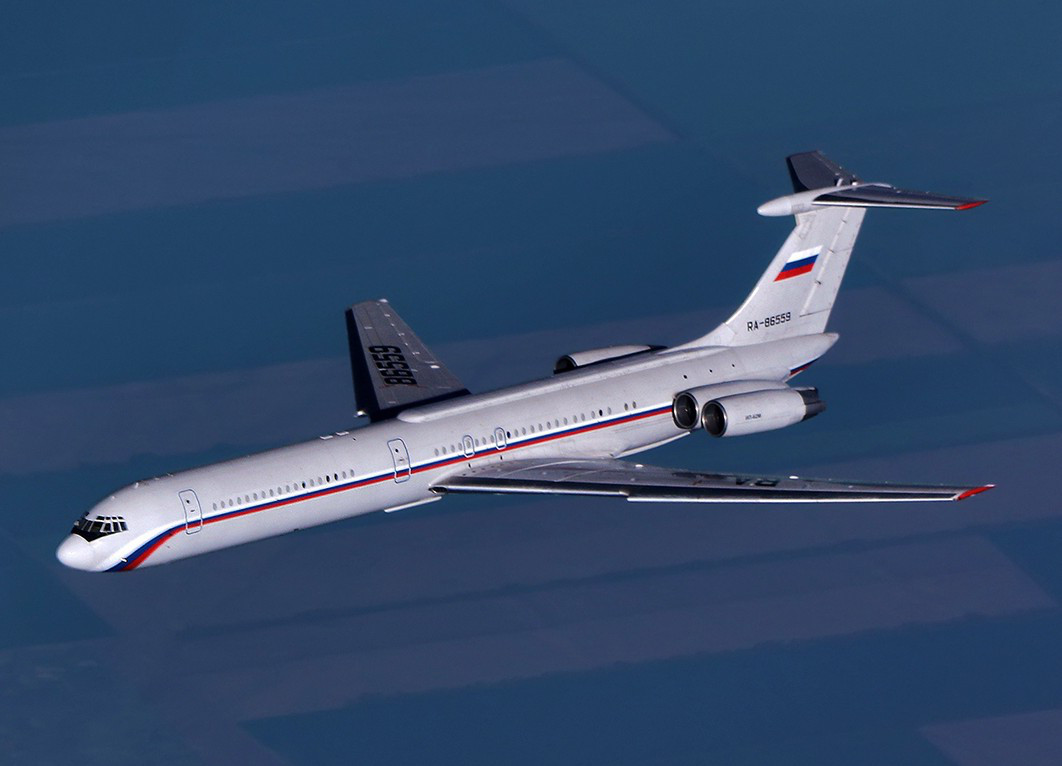
March 10, 1967: The world's new "largest airliner", the Il-62, begins passenger service

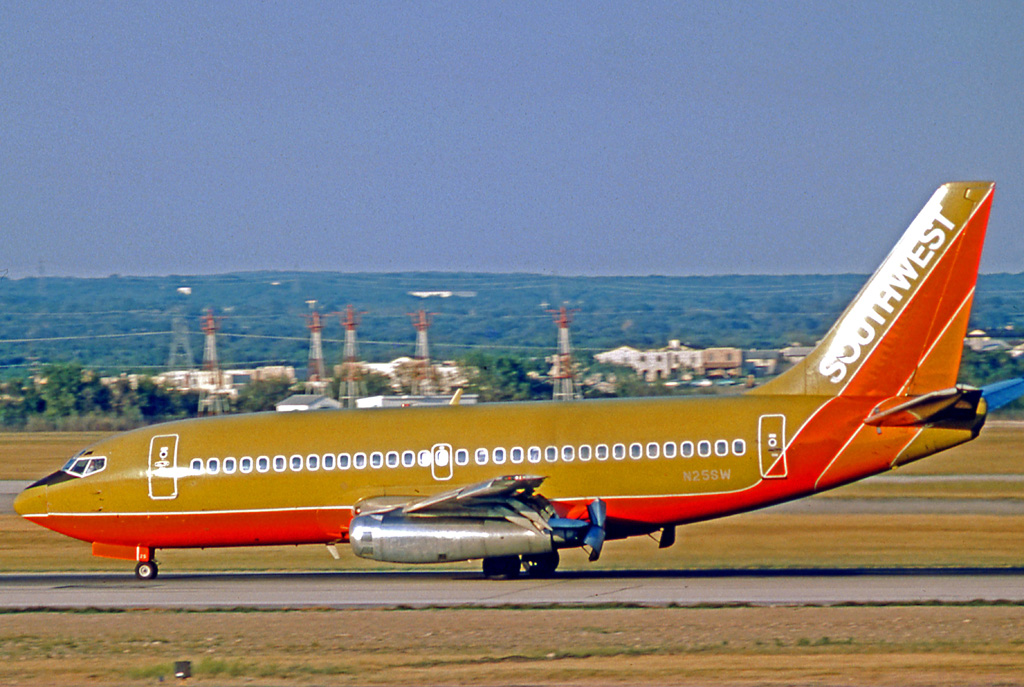
March 15, 1967: Southwest Airlines founded

The following events occurred in March 1967:

== March 1, 1967 (Wednesday) ==
- Óscar Gestido was sworn in as President of Uruguay, ending a 15-year experiment in "collegiate government" (el colegiado) in which the South American republic was administered by a nine-member Consejo Nacional de Gobierno, with a different member selected each year to preside over meetings. During the council's reign, Uruguay had functioned as a socialist state with a 30-hour work week, retirement at age 55 with full pay, and government jobs for 40% of the work force, but had also been plagued by inflation, frequent labor strikes, low productivity and widespread discontent. Gestido was sworn in for a five-year term, and the nine councilors (including council president Alberto Héber) stepped down.
- Clay Shaw, the former director of the International Trade Mart in New Orleans, became the first person since 1963 to be arrested on accusations of the assassination of U.S. President John F. Kennedy. The New Orleans District Attorney Jim Garrison had ordered that Shaw be charged with conspiracy to commit murder. After posting a bond of $10,000 Shaw was released. Garrison told reporters, "There will be more arrests," and added, "If you want to bet against me, you will lose."
- The U.S. House of Representatives voted 248 to 176 to bar New York Congressman Adam Clayton Powell Jr. from taking his seat in the House. An earlier resolution that would have censured Powell, but would have allowed him to serve, failed 202–222. Powell had been accused of diverting more than $56,000 in taxpayer funds for his personal use.
- Ernesto Miranda, whose original conviction for kidnapping and rape had been reversed after the 1963 decision by the U.S. Supreme Court that gave rise to the "Miranda warning" that bears his name, was found guilty on retrial and was given a sentence of 20 to 30 years in the Arizona State Prison.
- The Royal Australian Navy replaced the British White Ensign flag on all its ships with the Australian White Ensign.
- Brazilian police arrested Franz Stangl, ex-commander of Treblinka and Sobibór concentration camps.
- The Japanese railway system opened the new Hankyū Senri Line, connected to Osaka.
- The city of Hatogaya, in the Saitama Prefecture of Japan, was founded.
- The Queen Elizabeth Hall was opened in London.

== March 2, 1967 (Thursday) ==
- U.S. President Lyndon Johnson announced that Soviet Union Prime Minister Alexei Kosygin had agreed to discussions between the two nations to limit the number of offensive and defensive nuclear missiles that each side would possess. The Americans and Soviets would sign the Treaty on the Non-Proliferation of Nuclear Weapons on July 1, 1968, and commence the Strategic Arms Limitation Talks (referred to in the U.S. as SALT and in Russia as ogranichenii strategicheskikh vooruzheniy or OSV).
- Two U.S. Air Force planes mistakenly bombed the South Vietnamese village of Lang Vei in the Quang Tri Province with napalm, killing 135 men, women and children who were part of the Bru minority group. Another 213 civilians survived their burns. Less than a year later, the unfortunate hamlet would be the scene of the bloody Battle of Lang Vei between South Vietnamese and North Vietnamese troops.
- Seventeen-year-old Mar Sargis Yosip was consecrated a bishop of the Assyrian Church of the East. He would be exiled from his diocese of Baghdad, Iraq, in 2002.
- Died:
  - José Martínez Ruiz, 83, Spanish novelist who wrote under the pen name Azorín
  - Gordon Harker, 81, English stage and film actor and comedian

== March 3, 1967 (Friday) ==
- A bus with 43 passengers on board plunged off a steep precipice near the city of Malatya in eastern Turkey, killing at least 21 of them and injuring another 19. The bus was on a winding mountain road from Elazığ to Ankara when the driver lost control while negotiating a sharp curve.
- The Dewan Rakyat, lower house of the Parliament of Malaysia, voted 95–11 in favor of the National Language Act, rejecting attempts to make the Malay language the sole language for governmental use, and permitting Tamil, Mandarin Chinese and English as well.
- Born: Hans Teeuwen, Dutch comedian and filmmaker; in Budel

== March 4, 1967 (Saturday) ==
- A U.S. presidential commission recommended a reform to the American selective service system, in what was described as a "youngest first by random selection procedure". While the existing method was for local draft boards to fill their quotas starting with 26-year-old men, the new system would eliminate the 4,100 community draft boards and randomly select registered 19-year-old men. "If a man is not drafted at 19," a reporter noted, "chances are good under the new proposal that he would never be drafted short of total war."
- Queens Park Rangers became the first 3rd Division side to win the League Cup, defeating 1st Division side West Bromwich Albion 3–2, at the final at Wembley Stadium in front of 97,952 fans. As a 3rd Division team, QPR was ranked below the 22 first division and the 22 second division sides. Despite being behind, 2–0, at halftime, the Rangers scored three goals in the second half, including the winning kick by Mark Lazarus in the 81st minute.
- Former film and television actress Betty Furness was appointed by U.S. President Johnson to the newly created post of Special Assistant for Consumer Affairs. Despite initial concerns that she had been chosen solely for her celebrity status, Mrs. Furness would quickly prove to be a knowledgeable and effective consumer protection advocate.
- Saad Jumaa was sworn in as the new Prime Minister of Jordan, after the resignation of Wasfi al-Tal.
- Born:
  - Sam Taylor-Johnson, British director, artist and photographer; in Croydon, London
  - Daryll Cullinan, South African cricketer; in Kimberley, Northern Cape

== March 5, 1967 (Sunday) ==
- All 38 people on Lake Central Flight 527 were killed when the Convair CV-580 crashed after a propeller came loose during a storm, penetrated the cabin and severed control cables. The airliner, which was flying passengers from Cincinnati and Columbus to Toledo, Ohio, broke apart and fell from the sky onto a farm near the town of Marseilles, Ohio.
- The crash of Varig Airlines Flight 837 killed 51 of the 90 people on board, and five more on the ground, while on approach to Roberts International Airport in Monrovia, the capital of Liberia. The Douglas DC-8-33 jet had taken off from Rome, with a final scheduled destination of Rio de Janeiro, and was making a stop in the West African city.
- The deliberate act of a railway employee caused a train crash killed five passengers and injured 18 others near Conington, Huntingdonshire, on British Rail's East Coast Main Line. A 20-year old railway signalman, A. J. Frost, intentionally flipped a switch to activate a mechanical lock on the tracks. Frost, who had been discharged from the Royal Marines two years earlier for "hysteria and immature personality", would be tried for manslaughter and endangerment, but would be acquitted of the homicide charge.
- The first round of voting was held in the election for the National Assembly of France, with 279 of the 486 seats being filled by candidates who had won a majority of the votes. Runoff elections between the two top finishers for the remaining 207 seats would be held the following Sunday.
- Musicam sacram, the instruction by the Roman Catholic Church regarding sacred music, was issued by the Church's Sacred Congregation for Divine Worship.
- The Indonesian Army launched a military operation against Mbah Suro's hermitage armed forces in Nginggil in the Blora Regency on Central Java. The army managed to destroy the Mbah Suro movement, although they lost three personnel.
- Died:
  - Mohammad Mosaddegh, 84, former Prime Minister of Iran (deposed in a 1953 coup), died after 15 years under house arrest
  - Georges Vanier, 79, 19th Governor General of Canada since 1959
  - Mischa Auer, 61, Russian-born American film actor
  - Mbah Suro, 45, Indonesian shaman and mystic (b. 1921)

== March 6, 1967 (Monday) ==
- The Madras State Assembly was constituted in India under the leadership of the new Chief Minister C. N. Annadurai, following elections. Madras (later renamed the state of Tamil Nadu) was the first government of an Indian state to be controlled by a political party other than the Indian National Congress that governed most of nation, after Annadurai's Dravidian Party attained 179 seats in the 232-member assembly.
- The United Kingdom's first natural gas from the undersea drilling operations in the North Sea gas reservoirs was pumped ashore, being received from the West Sole operation 70 miles (110 km) off the shore of Easington, East Riding of Yorkshire.
- George S. Trimble Jr. joined NASA as Director of the Advanced Manned Missions Program, Office of Manned Space Flight, succeeding Edward Z. Gray, who resigned. Before joining NASA, Trimble had served as Vice President-Advanced Programs, The Martin Company, Baltimore, since 1960.
- Died:
  - Nelson Eddy, 65, American singer and film star, died several hours after suffering a stroke while singing in front of 400 patrons at the Sans Souci Hotel night club in Miami Beach, Florida. Eddy had finished singing "Love and Marriage" with his partner Gale Sherwood, and was starting his next song when his voice faltered. He told his fans, "Will you bear with me a minute?", then asked the pianist to play the song "Dardanella". A moment later, he stopped and said, "My face is getting numb. Is there a doctor in here?" and was helped off the stage, then taken to the Mount Sinai hospital after a physician rendered first aid.
  - Zoltán Kodály, 84, Hungarian composer and educator who invented the Kodály method for teaching music to primary school students
  - George Kelly, 63, American clinical psychologist and developer of the personal construct theory approach to psychotherapy

== March 7, 1967 (Tuesday) ==
- CBS Reports aired the first television news documentary in U.S. history to report on gay and lesbian issues. Hosted by Mike Wallace, and viewed by 40 million people, "The Homosexuals" "reflected the bias of the American Psychological Association... labeling homosexuality a mental illness" but also showed gays and lesbians as individuals whose civil rights were deprived. TV critics reacted differently, with Chicago Tribune columnist Clay Gowran, who called the show "garbage" and said that "it was permitted... not only to justify the aberration but, it seemed, to glorify it", while Tribune columnist Herb Lyon wrote that it "was one of the most intelligent, mature, incisive shows ever produced."
- Manuel Apud, a former official of Cuba's Ministry of Industry, testified before a U.S. Senate subcommittee that the Soviet Union had resumed placement of intermediate-range ballistic missiles in Cuba, four years after the Cuban Missile Crisis had ended with a Soviet pledge that it would not put nuclear missiles on the Caribbean island nation. Apud said that he had viewed the missiles and said that they were identical to the FROG (Free Range On Ground) missiles that could be transported on a mobile launcher.
- You're a Good Man, Charlie Brown, a musical comedy based on the comic strip Peanuts, was first performed, appearing as an "off-Broadway" musical at Theatre 80 in New York's East Village. With music and lyrics by Clark Gesner, the musical launched the career of Gary Burghoff, who appeared as the title character. Continuing to be performed at colleges and high schools, it is credited with being "the most produced musical in history".
- Jimmy Hoffa, President of the International Teamsters Union, began an 8-year federal prison sentence at the United States Penitentiary near Lewisburg, Pennsylvania, three years after his conviction for attempting to bribe a jury.
- Died: Alice B. Toklas, 89, American-born resident of Paris, author, and life partner of American author Gertrude Stein

== March 8, 1967 (Wednesday) ==
- In Anguilla, a person or persons who were unhappy about the British colony's incorporation into Saint Christopher-Nevis-Anguilla burned down the Government House in the island's capital, The Valley. The St. Kitts Warden for Anguilla, resident administrator Vincent F. Byron, had been the only person inside the building at the time and was able to escape uninjured, but "lost all his personal effects and a car" in the blaze. Byron would be forced to leave Anguilla on May 31, along with the police force from the rest of the West Indies, with the Anguillans severing relations with St. Kitts and Nevis.
- The U.S. Department of Defense announced that American forces in the Vietnam War had suffered their heaviest casualties since the start of the war, with 232 men killed and 1,381 wounded during the week ending March 4. The single bloodiest day was Tuesday, February 28, when 61 American servicemen died.

== March 9, 1967 (Thursday) ==
- U.S. Navy Lt. (jg) Frank Prendergast became "the only American aviator to escape after being captured in North Vietnam", after bailing out of his plane and coming down off the coast of North Vietnam's Thanh Hoa Province. After inflating his life preserver, Prendergast was forced to surrender when a party of NVA soldiers waded out toward him. As he and they slowly marched back toward shore, several U.S. Navy planes strafed the beach, and all but two of the soldiers fled. With each strafing run, the two soldiers would dive underwater while Prendergast remained standing. When Prendergast saw an SH-3 rescue helicopter, he waited for his two captors to go underwater again, pulled a small .25 caliber automatic from his flight suit and shot the first guard to surface, while the SH-3's door gunner killed the other one. Prendergast was safely flown back to the USS Kitty Hawk (CV-63).
- Joseph Stalin's daughter, Svetlana Alliluyeva, defected to the United States via the U.S. Embassy in New Delhi, which then flew her to Rome, and helped her find refuge in Geneva, Switzerland.

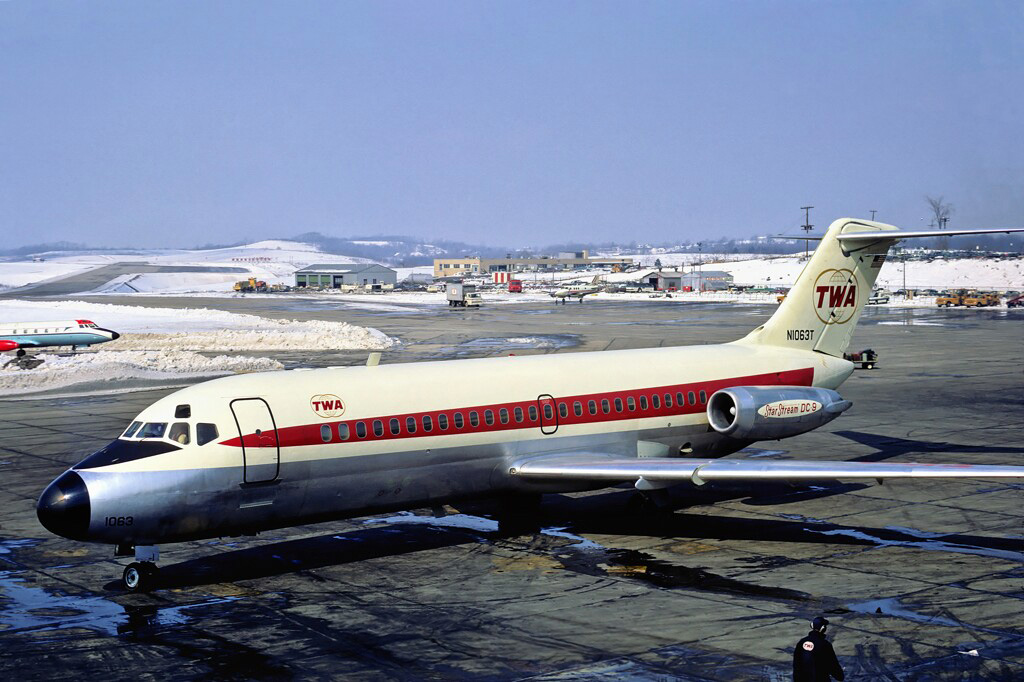
TWA Flight 553 prior to departure

- TWA Flight 553, a DC-9 jet flying from Pittsburgh to Dayton, Ohio, collided in mid-air with a small Beechcraft Baron executive plane over Concord Township, 5 miles (8.0 km) from Urbana, Ohio. All 25 people on the DC-9 (which was only one-third occupied) were killed, along with the Beechcraft's sole occupant. An investigation determined that the TWA jet, which was preparing to enter the holding pattern prior to a landing at the Dayton airport, descended onto the slower Beechcraft plane, whose pilot was flying from Detroit to a business conference in Springfield, Ohio. The accident would lead the Federal Aviation Administration to place speed restrictions on aircraft flying below 10,000 feet (3,048 m) and would contribute to its decision to create terminal control areas (TCAs).

== March 10, 1967 (Friday) ==
- American aircraft attacked the steel and iron works at Thái Nguyên, North Vietnam, for the first time. During the mission, USAF Captain Robert Pardo and his wingman, Captain Earl Aman, were flying F-4 Phantom jets, when Aman's plane was damaged by antiaircraft fire and lost almost all of its fuel. Captain Pardo radioed Aman to lower the stricken plane's tailhook and pushed Aman's F-4 by maneuvering to place Aman's tailhook against the base of his own windscreen. With one of his own F-4's engines on fire, Pardo pushed Aman's powerless plane for 90 miles (145 km), and all four men aboard the two fighters ejected over Laos, where they could avoid capture, rather than North Vietnam. Another USAF Captain, Merlyn Hans Dethlefsen, earned the Medal of Honor for his heroism on the same day, destroying one of the North Vietnamese missile sites guarding Thai Nguyen, despite the damage to his own F-105 Thunderchief. Captain Dethlefsen would be presented the nation's highest honor by President Johnson on February 1, 1968.
- Mrs. Maria Teresa Sepulveda, a 21-year-old woman in Mexico City, gave birth in the first confirmed case of octuplets, four boys and four girls. Although all eight were born alive, none of the Sepulveda babies, who ranged in size from 18.5 ounces (520 g) to 22 ounces (620 g), survived, with the last one, a boy, dying 14 hours after his birth.
- The world's largest jetliner, the Soviet Union's Ilyushin Il-62, with room for up to 200 passengers, inaugurated regular service with an Aeroflot flight from Moscow to Khabarovsk. International service would begin on September 15 with an Il-62 flight from Moscow to Montreal.

== March 11, 1967 (Saturday) ==
- The first list of endangered species was issued by Stewart Udall, the U.S. Secretary of the Interior with a total of 78 animals in the U.S. that were threatened with extinction. The list contained 14 mammals (including the grizzly bear, the red wolf, and the Florida manatee); 36 birds (including the Southern bald eagle, the California condor, and the ivory-billed woodpecker; three reptiles (including the American alligator); three amphibians (including the black toad), and 22 fishes (including the blue walleye and five varieties of trout). Animals on the list that would become extinct after 1967 were the dusky seaside sparrow, the longjaw cisco and the Maryland darter.
- The AGM-62 Walleye bomb, which had a television camera and could be guided to its target after being released, was used for the first time in combat, with the U.S. Navy making an attack on the Sam Son barracks of the North Vietnamese Army.
- The first phase of the Cambodian Civil War began between the Kingdom of Cambodia and the Khmer Rouge.
- Born: John Barrowman, Scottish-born American stage actor; in Glasgow
- Died: Geraldine Farrar, 85, American soprano, actress and star of opera and film

== March 12, 1967 (Sunday) ==
- The Indonesian State Assembly took all presidential powers from Sukarno and named Suharto as acting president. Suharto would be elected President of Indonesia on March 27, 1968, and would serve 30 years, resigning on May 21, 1998, after an economic collapse.
- The Chicago Blackhawks finally broke the "Curse of Muldoon" that had supposedly been placed upon them in 1927 when coach Pete Muldoon was fired. The 40-year curse was that the Blackhawks would never again finish in first place in the one-division National Hockey League, though it had not prevented the Hawks from winning the Stanley Cup in 1934, 1938 and 1961, and the story was not reduced to print until a Toronto sportswriter had popularized it. Well before the end of the 1966–1967 season, Chicago had clinched the Prince of Wales Trophy (for best regular season record), and would finish with 84 points (37 wins, 10 ties and 14 losses), far ahead of the New York Rangers' 65 points (27–11–23).
- Deputies were elected for the legislatures of nine of the Soviet Union's 15 constituent republics, including the Russian SFSR. All candidates were unopposed, but voters had the right to cross out names of persons whom they did not want. In the Russian Republic balloting, "Only 203,461 of the 81,445,729 voters crossed out the names of official candidates" for the 884 people on the ballot, and "the pattern was the same" in the other elections.
- The second round of voting for the National Assembly of France, with the remaining 207 of the 486 seats filled in runoff elections. President Charles de Gaulle's Union des Démocrates pour la République (UDR) Party, nicknamed "the Gaullists", emerged with 244 of the seats, one more than the 243 needed for a majority, after candidate Paul Valentino won a close race for the seat for the French Overseas Territory of Guadeloupe.
- The Velvet Underground's groundbreaking first album, The Velvet Underground & Nico, was released. Initially a commercial failure, it would receive widespread critical and commercial acclaim in later years.
- Born: Massimiliano Frezzato, Italian comic book author; in Turin
- Died:
  - Arthur David Ritchie, 75, English philosopher and scientist
  - Isaac Scott Hathaway, 94, African-American sculptor

== March 13, 1967 (Monday) ==
- South African Airways Flight 406, a Vickers Viscount 818 with 20 passengers and a crew of five, crashed into the Indian Ocean a mile and a half from Kayser's Beach as it was preparing to land at East London, Eastern Cape. The plane had departed Port Elizabeth half an hour earlier and East London was its first stop on the way to Johannesburg. At 7:10 in the evening, the plane impacted the ocean and no one survived; 21 bodies had washed ashore on the beach by the next day. An investigating board speculated that Captain Benjamin Lipawsky might have suffered a heart attack because he had earlier reported "symptoms suggestive of cardio-vascular trouble" and that his co-pilot, Brian Trenwith, might have had difficulty in regaining control of the plane.
- The Indian state of Rajasthan was placed under President's rule after violent protests followed elections in which no party was able to receive a clear majority in the State Assembly. The emergency rule by the national government would end on April 28 with the formation of a coalition government under Mohanlal Sukhadia.
- Moise Tshombe, ex-prime minister of Congo, was sentenced to death in absentia. On June 30, Tshombe's plane would be hijacked and flown to Algeria, where he would remain in prison for the rest of his life, dying on June 30, 1969.
- Born: Andrés Escobar, Colombian soccer football defender, with 51 appearances for the national team from 1988 to 1994; in Medellín (murdered, 1994)

== March 14, 1967 (Tuesday) ==
- Nine executives and scientists of the West German pharmaceutical company Chemie Gruenenthal were indicted on criminal charges in Aachen for breaking German drug laws because of thalidomide. Company President Hermann Wirtz was the most prominent defendant, and the nine faced a maximum sentence of five years in prison. Chief Prosecutor Heinrich Gierlich told reporters that 5,000 babies had been born crippled between 1957 and 1962 as a result of thalidomide poisoning.
- A group of 100,000 students marched through the streets of Beijing, shouting protests against the "February Adverse Current" that had seen the Chinese Army reclaim control of cities taken over by the Red Guards. Vice-Premiers Tan Zhenlin and Li Fuchun, and Marshals Xu Xiangqian, Nie Rongzhen and Chen Yi (China's Foreign Minister) were the targets of the demonstration.
- The body of U.S. President John F. Kennedy was moved, along with the bodies of two of his children who died in infancy, to a permanent burial place at Arlington National Cemetery, 20 feet (6.1 m) from the site where he had been laid to rest on November 25, 1963.
- Prime Minister of India Indira Gandhi formed a new cabinet, with her chief political rival in the Indian Congress Party, Morarji Desai, becoming Deputy Prime Minister.

== March 15, 1967 (Wednesday) ==
- Southwest Airlines, which would become one of the four largest airlines in the United States by the 21st century, was founded in Texas as Air Southwest Company, Inc., by Herb Kelleher and Kenneth B. Ragsdale. On June 17, 1971, the company would assume its present name and inaugurate a low cost jet service between Dallas, Houston and San Antonio.
- General Artur da Costa e Silva was sworn in as the 22nd President of Brazil, succeeding Humberto Castelo Branco. Costa e Silva would serve until October 30, 1969, being removed from office following a cerebral hemorrhage.
- Born: Naoko Takeuchi, Japanese manga artist who created the Sailor Moon series; in Kōfu

== March 16, 1967 (Thursday) ==
- In the ASPIDA scandal in Greece, 15 officers were given sentences ranging from 2 to 18 years in prison, after being convicted of treason and intentions of staging a coup. ASPIDA (Axiomatikí Sósate Patrída Idaniká Dimokratía Axiokratía), literally "officers united to save our nation's democratic ideals" was an acronym using the Greek word for "shield" (aspida), and the group consisted of 33 junior Greek Army officers who were working together to advance their careers; the scandal would lead to the resignation of Prime Minister Ioannis Paraskevopoulos.
- The first of two unexplained incidents happened at Malmstrom Air Force Base, near Great Falls, Montana, where the U.S. Air Force had missile silos for its Minuteman ICBMs. According to later accounts, crews in the areas had seen unidentified objects hovering near or over the silos of the Echo Flight section, and starting at 8:45, the launch facilities of ten missiles began going offline and inoperable. Eight days later, at the Oscar Flight section of Malmstrom AFB, another set of missiles went offline after a UFO was seen.
- Sardar Hukam Singh completed his term as speaker of the 3rd Lok Sabha of India. He was succeeded by future Indian President Neelam Sanjiva Reddy as the 4th Lok Sabha began its five-year parliamentary session. Hukam Singh would become Governor of Rajasthan state a month later.
- Singapore amended its National Service Act, requiring all male citizens to begin two years of service in the Singapore Armed Forces upon reaching their 18th birthdays.
- Born: Lauren Graham, American TV actress and star of Gilmore Girls; in Honolulu

== March 17, 1967 (Friday) ==
- The "Declaration on the Croatian Language" was issued by a group of prominent intellectuals in Yugoslavia and marked the beginning of the movement referred to as the "Croatian Spring", a political quest for an autonomous Croatian state within the Yugoslavian federation. Dalibor Brozovic, Miroslav Brandt, Ivo Franges, Ljudevit Jonke, Slavko Mihalic, Vlatko Pavletic, Jaksa Ravlic and Petar Segedin would be among the signatories who would lose their academic jobs or be expelled from the ruling League of Communists of Yugoslavia.
- An opposition political party, the All People's Congress led by Siaka Stevens, won the parliamentary election in Sierra Leone, marking the first time that a ruling party had lost an election in sub-Saharan Africa (excluding white-ruled South Africa and Southern Rhodesia). Stevens would be appointed Prime Minister four days later, then would be overthrown the same day.
- Donald K. Slayton, Manned Spacecraft Center (MSC) Director of Flight Crew Operations, expressed concern over the excessive number of experiments assigned to the first Apollo Applications Program (AAP) mission.
- After 4 days of recording their album in January, the Grateful Dead released their self-titled debut album.
- Born: Billy Corgan, lead singer for The Smashing Pumpkins; in Chicago, Illinois

== March 18, 1967 (Saturday) ==
- The supertanker Torrey Canyon ran aground on Pollard's Rock in the Seven Stones reef between the Cornish mainland and the Isles of Scilly, loaded with 119,328 tonnes (almost 875,000 barrels or 36.7 million gallons) of crude oil. The oil was being shipped by BP Trading Ltd. from Kuwait to a refinery at Milford Haven in Pembrokeshire, Wales, and was reportedly trying to avoid a collision with fishing vessels when it struck the reef. Initially, six of the 18 tanks on the Torrey Canyon were split open, releasing 30,000 tonnes of oil. Ultimately, the vessel would release 32 million gallons of oil, much of which washed up on the Cornish coast.
- The first demonstration of "slow motion instant replay" on television was shown to viewers of ABC Wide World of Sports who had tuned in to see the finals of the "World Series of Skiing" at Vail, Colorado. The repeating of a scene at its original speed had been shown as early as December 7, 1963, but the Ampex HS-100 made it possible to slow down, freeze, or reverse the action for analysis by television commentators.
- Judy Hashman, a former American from Baltimore who had emigrated to the United Kingdom, won her 10th All-England singles title in badminton, defeating Noriko Takagi of Japan in the 1967 All England Badminton Championships, opened at Wembley Arena, London. In the men's championship, Erland Kops of Denmark defeated Tan Aik Huang of Malaysia to win the title for the seventh time.
- "Pirates of the Caribbean", a theme park ride that would become the basis for a successful series of films 35 years later, was opened as a featured attraction at the Disneyland theme park in Anaheim, California.

== March 19, 1967 (Sunday) ==
- A referendum in French Somaliland (later independent as Djibouti) favored the connection to France. The final result was 22,555 voting "yes" toward continuing as a French colony, and 14,666 voting "no", in favor of independence. Most of the yes votes were from the Afar people who lived in the north; most of the no votes were from ethnic Somalis.
- The final of Brazil's Torneio dos Campeões 1967 football competition was won by Bangu, 1–0, over Atlético Mineiro at Belo Horizonte.
- The seaside resort of Caraguatatuba in Brazil was inundated by a flash flood of the Rio Cumburi that killed more than 100 people.
- The Vienna Convention on Consular Relations entered into force and would eventually be ratified by nearly all of the world's nations.
- Died: Sir Frederick E. Morgan, 73, British Army Lieutenant-General and Chief of Staff to Field Marshal Bernard Montgomery in the initial planning of Operation Overlord during World War II.

== March 20, 1967 (Monday) ==
- British Rail reopened the remaining section of line on the Isle of Wight, from Ryde Pier Head to Shanklin, after electrification to the Southern Region standard (750 V DC third rail) using former London Underground "Tube" stock.
- Elementary and secondary schools resumed classes in China, after being closed since August during the Cultural Revolution.
- Born: Bajram Begaj, President of Albania since 2022; in Rrogozhinë, Albania

== March 21, 1967 (Tuesday) ==
- A military coup took place in Sierra Leone moments after Siaka Stevens was about to be sworn in as the West African nation's new Prime Minister by Governor-General Henry Lightfoot Boston. Stevens, whose party had won a majority in parliament in elections four days earlier, was preparing to take the oath at the State House in Freetown, when troops led by Sierra Leone Army General David Lansana arrested him and Boston. "If the army had not intervened," a historian would write later, "Sierra Leone would have been an example of the first peaceful transfer of political power in independent Africa, with a propensity to nourish democratic principles. The presumption of the military established a dangerous precedent for subsequent civil-military relations." Lansana would be overthrown in a counter-coup two days later.
- Charles Manson was released from the Terminal Island prison in California after being incarcerated since 1960 and ordered to complete a 1957 prison sentence. Telling the authorities that "prison had become his home", that he had nowhere to go, and that he "didn't think he could adjust to the world outside", Manson asked to stay, but was released on schedule at 8:15 in the morning. Upon his release, he relocated to San Francisco, settled in the Haight-Ashbury neighborhood, and spent 1967's "Summer of Love" forming the group of followers known as "The Manson Family".
- Born:
  - Adrian Chiles, English TV and radio sports commentator; in Quinton, Birmingham
  - Jonas "Joker" Berggren, Swedish songwriter for Ace of Base; in Gothenburg

== March 22, 1967 (Wednesday) ==
- Lee Soo-keun, the vice-president of North Korea's central news agency, defected to the south while covering a meeting of the Joint Military Armistice Commission at the neutral border village of Panmunjom. Lee hopped into an American car as U.N. Command representatives were preparing to leave, and was chased by guards from the north. U.S. Army Captain Thomas F. Bair said later that he "threw a football block" to stop two guards who tried to climb into the car, and Lt. Colonel Donald E. Thomson ordered the car's driver, Sergeant Terry McAnelly, to flee through a barricade as bullets were fired.
- For the second time in three weeks, the U.S. Coast Guard seized a Soviet Union fishing trawler for violating American territorial waters. Coast Guard aircraft sighted the 178-foot (54 m) long vessel, SRTM 8-457, south of the sparsely populated Shumagin Islands of Alaska, and the Coast Guard cutter USCGC Storis took it under tow. On March 2, the trawler SRTM 8-413 had been seized off Mitrofania Island.
- In his last bout before being stripped of his world heavyweight boxing championship, Muhammad Ali defeated challenger Zora Folley with a knockout in the 7th round at New York's Madison Square Garden.
- The Iron and Steel Act 1967 came into law in the United Kingdom, authorizing the nationalization of private steel companies and creating the British Steel Corporation effective July 28.
- Born: Mario Cipollini, Italian cyclist; in Lucca

== March 23, 1967 (Thursday) ==
- NASA halted further training for three scheduled U.S. crewed space missions and disbanded their three-member crews, pending an overhaul of the Apollo program in light of the January 27 fire that killed the astronauts of Apollo 1. Wally Schirra, Donn F. Eisele and Walter Cunningham had been the backup crew for Apollo 1 and would have been part of a rescheduled mission. James McDivitt, David Scott and Rusty Schweickart had been set for a summer launch of Apollo 2, and Frank Borman, Michael Collins and William Anders would have been on Apollo 3 in the autumn. Schirra, Eisele and Cunningham would go up together on Apollo 7 in 1968; McDivitt, Scott and Schweickart would test the Apollo Lunar Module on Apollo 9 in 1969; Borman and Anders would orbit the Moon (with Jim Lovell) on Apollo 8 in 1968; and Collins would remain in lunar orbit on the Apollo 11 mission in 1969 with Neil Armstrong and Buzz Aldrin.
- Brigadier General David Lansana, who had led the coup to depose Sierra Leone's new Prime Minister Siaka Stevens, was arrested at 2:00 in the morning by three of his officers, Major Charles Blake, and Majors Bockarie Kai-Simba and Sandi B. Jumu. Major Blake then seized the Freetown radio station and declared that the West African country would be ruled by a new 8-member "National Reformation Council", to be led by Lt. Colonel Ambrose T. Genda, a Sierra Leonean representative to the United Nations. Genda told reporters the next day that he was "very surprised" about the appointment and did not say whether he would accept.
- Rebel guerrillas commanded by Che Guevara of Cuba ambushed a 32-man patrol of the Bolivian Army. The attack took place near the guerrilla base at Ñancahuazú in southeastern Bolivia. In addition to killing seven soldiers and taking two officers and nine soldiers prisoner, Guevara's men captured an arsenal of 16 Mauser rifles, three 60-mm mortars, a 30 caliber machine gun, two submachine guns and two Uzi machine pistols, 2,500 rounds of ammunition, 64 mortar shells, and the Bolivian Army's operations plan.
- The Soo Line Railroad (originally the Minneapolis, St. Paul and Sault Ste. Marie Railroad), operated by the Canadian Pacific Railway in both Canada and the United States, permanently discontinued its passenger train operations as its last train, The Winnipegger, departed St. Paul, Minnesota, at 8:45 in the morning on the way back to Winnipeg, Manitoba.
- Died:
  - Lalla Carlsen, 77, Norwegian singer and actress
  - Pete Johnson, 62, American blues musician

== March 24, 1967 (Friday) ==
- The U.S. Department of Defense released its weekly list of American casualties in the Vietnam War, showing 211 servicemen killed in action during the week of March 12 to March 18, and according to the Associated Press tabulations, "American deaths from all causes in Vietnam since 1961 passed the 10,000 mark," based on unofficial tabulations that as of the latest report "8,306 Americans were killed in action and 1,788 died from accidents and other nonhostile causes," bringing the total to 10,094.
- Rao Birender Singh was sworn in as the second Chief Minister of the recently created Indian state of Haryana after forming a coalition government dominated by the United Front party that had recently taken control of the state from the Congress Party. Birender Singh replaced the first Chief Minister, B. D. Sharma, who had assumed office when Haryana became a state on November 1.
- A milestone in the development of the California wine industry took place as, for the first time, sales in the U.S. of the lighter "table wine", produced in California, exceeded those of "fortified wine" that included the addition of brandy or another distilled spirit. Author Charles Sullivan would make the calculation in an article (titled "March 24, 1967") for the industry journal Wines & Vines.
- Jayaprakash Narayan declined a nomination to be a candidate for the third President of India, and said in a statement that he considered Dr. Zakir Husain (who would win election) to be the best person for the job.
- The Canadian coaster SS Myalls caught fire and sank off Shelburne, Nova Scotia.

== March 25, 1967 (Saturday) ==
- The beaches of Cornwall received their first oil from the spill from the Torrey Canyon, coming ashore on the peninsula known as "The Lizard", the southernmost portion of Great Britain. The lake of oil, which had started spilling a week earlier, was driven ashore by high winds from a storm.
- Martin Luther King Jr. declared in a speech in Chicago that "we must combine the fervor of the civil rights movement with the peace movement", and expanded his outreach to an audience to all people living in poverty beyond African-Americans.
- Pat Casey of Norwalk, California, broke the world record for heaviest weight lifted in bench press competition, becoming the first person to bench press more than 600 pounds (270 kg).
- Born:
  - Debi Thomas, the first African-American world figure skating champion (1986) and world professional champion (1988, 1989 and 1991); in Poughkeepsie, New York
  - Matthew Barney, American artist and filmmaker; in San Francisco
- Died: Johannes Itten, 78, Swiss expressionist painter

== March 26, 1967 (Sunday) ==
- Scottish nationalists removed signs that marked the border between England and Scotland, in a symbolic act of reclaiming Berwick-upon-Tweed, which had changed hands between the kingdoms of England and Scotland but had been taken by the Kingdom of England from the Kingdom of Scotland in 1482. The border signs, which were located 3 miles (4.8 km) north of Berwick, were taken during the night and replanted south of town. City officials would return the border markings to their marked location a few days later.
- Jim Thompson, an American who had been successful in founding the Thai Silk Company in Bangkok after World War II, disappeared while on a vacation with friends in Malaysia near Tanah Rata. On the afternoon of Easter Sunday, Thompson set off from his room at the Moonlight Cottage for a walk in the jungles of the Cameron Highlands, and was never seen again.
- The Reverend Albert Cleage, an African-American Congregationalist minister in Detroit, launched the Black Christian National Movement on Easter Sunday, renaming his Central Congregational Church as the Shrine of the Black Madonna. Cleage's theory was that Mary was a member of the non-white Israelite tribe of Judah and that she and Jesus Christ had been black.
- Battered by a gale, the 974-foot (297 m) long Torrey Canyon broke into two pieces eight days after it had wrecked, sending almost all of its remaining cargo of crude oil (50,000 tonnes or more than 1.5 million gallons) into the sea off the coast of Cornwall.
- The first national convention of underground newspaper publishers and writers was held, taking place at Stinson Beach, California.

== March 27, 1967 (Monday) ==
- Lt. Colonel Andrew Juxon-Smith was named as the new head of state for Sierra Leone as Chairman of the National Reformation Council. Lt. Colonel Ambrose Genda, who had been named head of state on Thursday, was "fired... before he had a chance to take the job" and was informed of the news as Juxon-Smith and Genda prepared to board a plane in London to fly home to Freetown.
- Died: Jaroslav Heyrovský, 76, Czech chemist and winner of the Nobel Prize in Chemistry in 1959 for his invention of polarography

== March 28, 1967 (Tuesday) ==
- Pope Paul VI issued the encyclical Populorum progressio, giving support to the principle of educating the public about birth control, without relaxing the long-standing ban of the Roman Catholic Church on artificial contraception. The Pope wrote that the temptation to use "radical measures" to control the population explosion was strong, but that any governmental measures on birth control had to be "in conformity with moral law". Other subjects covered by the encyclical included a statement on poverty that "help for those who lack basic needs" must come before free commerce and private property rights, called on the world's nations to divert money from building weapons to relieving misery, condemned unlimited reliance on profit as a means of economic progress, and suggested higher taxes on the wealthy in order to aid the poor. The encyclical was issued two days after Easter. On April 18, the Vatican's official newspaper, L'Osservatore Romano, would clarify that the encyclical must not be misinterpreted as a change in the Church's position against birth control other than by abstinence.
- In what was described as "one of history's most stunning elections", the U.S. state of Florida became "the first two-party state in the south" as the Republican Party won 20 of the 48 seats in the state senate, and 40 of the 119 in the state house of representatives. Before the election, Democrats held 37 senate seats and Republicans held 11. The Democrats formerly held 97 house seats while the GOP held 26. The shift meant that Governor Claude Kirk, a Republican, had veto power over state legislation because the opposing party no longer had the necessary 2/3rds majority to override his actions.
- The slam dunk was outlawed for NCAA and high school basketball starting with the 1967–68 season, and the act of reaching more than 10 inches above the basket rim would be penalized for ten consecutive seasons. The 20-member National Basketball Committee of the United States and Canada voted to ban the crowd-pleasing dunk shot after concluding that tall players like UCLA's Lew Alcindor— who would later change his name to Kareem Abdul-Jabbar— had an unfair advantage over the defense. The ban would not be lifted until the 1976–77 season.
- Eight jet bombers and 20 jet fighters from the Fleet Air Arm (of the Royal Navy) and the Royal Air Force dropped firebombs and tanks of aviation fuel on the wreckage of the supertanker Torrey Canyon and the mile-wide carpet of oil that had been leaking into the sea for the past ten days, in an effort to prevent further befouling of the beaches of Cornwall. "The greatest of all fires at sea" burned the floating oil and sent up a thick black column of smoke that reached altitudes of ten miles and more.
- A bus crash killed 27 schoolchildren and injured another 29 in Saint-Denis on the Indian Ocean island of Réunion. The bus went out of control and fell into a river.

== March 29, 1967 (Wednesday) ==
- The 1967 World Ice Hockey Championships, held in Vienna, Austria, were won by the Soviet Union for the fifth year in a row. The Soviet team won all seven of its games, defeating Czechoslovakia 4–2 in a game marked by fist fights. At one point in the game, "seven players were in the penalty box at one time", leaving only one Russian skater and two Czechoslovak skaters, and each side's goaltenders, on the ice. The Soviet team also beat Sweden, Canada, the U.S., Finland, East Germany and West Germany. Sweden defeated Canada, 6–0, in the other game to be awarded second place. After the game, 56 of the spectators from Czechoslovakia asked for political asylum, as well as nine from Hungary and two from Poland.
- The nation of Greece presented former U.S. President Harry S Truman a 2,500-year old helmet that had been worn by an Athenian soldier, "in everlasting recognition of a great debt" on the 20th anniversary of the 1947 proclamation of the Truman Doctrine that the U.S. would protect Greece (and Turkey) from communist aggression. Alexander A. Matsas, the Greek ambassador to the United States, handed what he described as "one of the most significant relics that has ever been yielded by the ancient soil of Greece" to U.S. Secretary of State Dean Rusk, commenting that the gift for Truman was "the helmet of an Athenian citizen who fell in defending democracy and freedom."
- The United States Court of Appeals for the Fifth Circuit voted, 8 to 4, to affirm a decision ordering the integration of any remaining racially segregated public schools in the six southern states in its jurisdiction, and to do so in time for the opening of the 1967–68 school year. The ruling directly affected Alabama, Florida, Georgia, Louisiana, Mississippi and Texas, and served as precedent for segregated schools elsewhere in the United States. The case specifically involved a December 29 district court order brought to desegregate school systems in the Caddo, Bossier, Jackson and Claiborne parishes of Louisiana, Jefferson County, Alabama, and the Alabama cities of Fairfield and Bessemer.
- At 5:00 a.m. Eastern Time, the employees of all three television networks (ABC, CBS and NBC) and their radio networks went on strike. Announcers, newscasters, actors, and other performers who were members of the American Federation of Television and Radio Artists (AFTRA) walked off the job for the first time in AFTRA's history, after being unable to agree on a new collective bargaining agreement to replace the contract that had expired on November 15. The strike would be settled after 13 days and would end on April 10 in time for CBS to host the Academy Awards telecast.
- Ecuador became an oil-producing nation as a drilling consortium jointly operated by the Texaco and Gulf Oil corporations struck oil in at the Lago Agrio oil field in the Amazon jungle, at the Sucumbíos Province.
- The first French nuclear submarine, Le Redoutable, was launched from Cherbourg, and would soon be armed with 16 MSBS nuclear missiles.
- Born: Brian Jordan, American athlete who played two seasons as a defensive back in the NFL for the Atlanta Falcons, 1989 to 1991, followed by 15 seasons as an outfielder in Major League Baseball from 1992 to 2006 for the St. Louis Cardinals and the Atlanta Braves; in Baltimore, Maryland

== March 30, 1967 (Thursday) ==
- SEACOM, the South-East Asia Commonwealth telephone cable, inaugurated service at 3:00 p.m. local time in a ceremony at the Wentworth Hotel in Sydney, making it possible for direct calls between Australia and its neighbors in the Pacific, which in turn allowed calls to the rest of the world. Speaking from Buckingham Palace at 5:00 in the morning London time, Queen Elizabeth II spoke for two minutes to the crowd. Deputy Prime Minister of Australia John McEwen then hosted a series of conversations between other prime ministers, beginning with Keith Holyoake of New Zealand chatting with Tunku Abdul Rahman of Malaysia. The 7,070-nautical-mile (13,090 km; 8,140 mi) undersea cable connected Sydney to Kuala Lumpur and Singapore "via Cairns, Madang, Guam, Hong Kong and Kota Kinabulu" and has been described as "the greatest single Commonwealth achievement in communications".
- A Delta Air Lines DC-8 jet crashed into the Hilton Inn and three neighboring houses in New Orleans, after taking off from the airport to begin a training flight. Flight 9877 was turning to make a practice landing when it stalled and then plummeted into the residential neighborhood at 12:50 in the morning, killing 13 people on the ground and all six of the crew on the plane. Nine of the victims were girls from Union High School in Juda, Wisconsin, who were on a senior class trip during spring break. The Federal Aviation Administration would later conclude that the crash had been caused by the crew's decision to lower the flaps to full landing position (50 degrees down) "while the plane was still a mile from the airport", slowing the airspeed, halting rudder and aileron control and allowing the plane to roll.
- The Beatles posed with a photographic collage and wax figures from Madame Tussaud's famous museum for the cover artwork of Sgt. Pepper's Lonely Hearts Club Band album at Chelsea Manor Studios in London.
- Born:
  - Albert-László Barabási, Romanian-born Hungarian and American physicist; in Cârța, Harghita County
  - Allison Grodner, American director, writer and an executive producer of the reality show Big Brother
- Died: Jean Toomer, 72, African-American novelist and poet in the "Harlem Renaissance"

== March 31, 1967 (Friday) ==
- U.S. President Lyndon Johnson signed the instrument of ratification of the consular treaty between the United States and the Soviet Union. Representatives of both nations had signed the bilateral agreement on June 1, 1964, but the U.S. Senate did not ratify it until March 16, 1967. The convention, which addressed "procedures to be followed in nondiplomatic relations", would go into effect later in the year.
- The Chinese Communist Party made its first official attack against President Liu Shaoqi, as the journal Red Flag condemned Liu's 1939 book, How to Be a Good Communist. The official journal wrote that the book "takes a roundabout route to push bourgeois individualism and slavery" and that "its bad influence must be thrown out."
- Kicking off a tour with The Walker Brothers, Cat Stevens and Engelbert Humperdinck at The Astoria London, Jimi Hendrix set fire to his guitar on stage for the first time. He was taken to hospital suffering burns to his hands. The guitar-burning act would later become a trademark of Hendrix's performances.
- Died: Marshal Rodion Malinovsky, 68, Defense Minister of the Soviet Union since 1957
