= Sunset Boulevard (soundtrack) =

Sunset Boulevard: Original Motion Picture Score

Soundtrack album by Franz Waxman
- Released: November 19, 2002
- Label: Varèse Sarabande

The soundtrack to the film Sunset Boulevard (1950) was composed by Franz Waxman.

In 2005, Franz Waxman's score was named #16 of the top 25 film scores in the American Film Institute's "100 Years of Film Scores" list.

It was released on CD in 2002, an edition that was re-recorded by Joel McNeely and the Scottish Symphony Orchestra. The actual surviving parts of the original score were released in 2010 on Counterpoint.

A suite from the score, as well as arrangement by the conductor John Mauceri of various cues in sonata form are published by Sony Music.

== Track listing ==
Sunset Boulevard: Original Motion Picture Score
No.	Title	Length
1.	"Sunset Boulevard Prelude"	3:51
2.	"Paramount Studio"	0:55
3.	"Chase and Mansion"	3:42
4.	"Norma Desmond"	2:18
5.	"An Aging Actress"	0:54
6.	"Reading the Script"	2:34
7.	"The Strange Garden"	1:56
8.	"Norma's Gallery"	1:24
9.	"The Waxworks and the Bridge Game"	1:44
10.	"Afternoon Outings"	1:00
11.	"Sacrifice of Self-Respect"	4:07
12.	"The Old Bathing Beauty"	2:29
13.	"Parading to Paramount"	0:55
14.	"Old Friends"	1:26
15.	"DeMille's Companion"	0:42
16.	"Norma's Suspicions"	3:55
17.	"A New Interest and the Studio Stroll"	5:08
18.	"Her First Husband"	2:56
19.	"The Showdown"	4:14
20.	"Farewell"	1:56
21.	"Joe Walks Out"	5:22
22.	"The Corpse"	1:11
23.	"The Comeback"	4:24
24.	"Sunset Boulevard Cast"	0:31
25.	"Prelude and Conversing Corpses"	9:01
Total length:		69:41
