= Sunset Boulevard (restaurant) =

Danish fast food chain

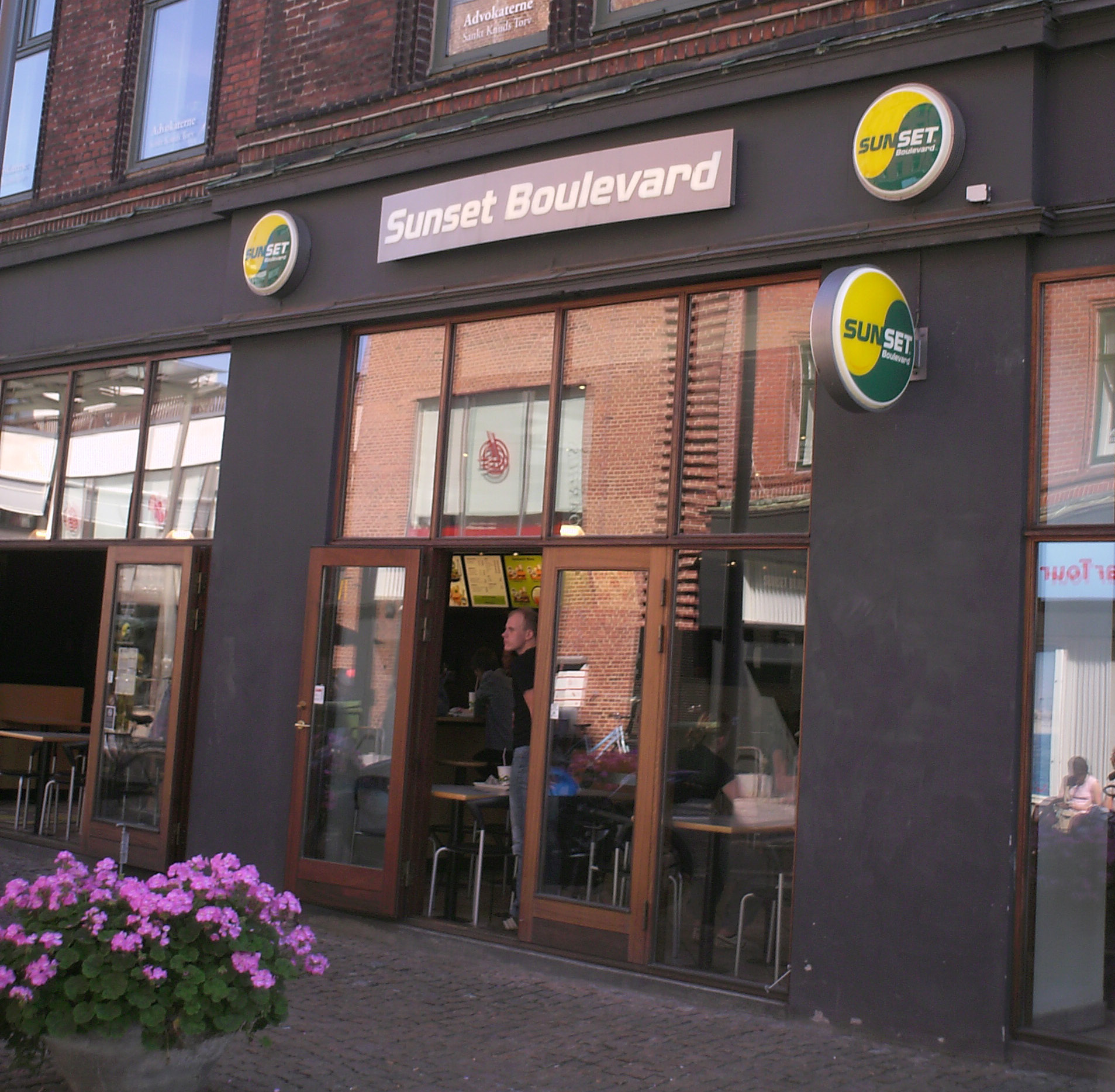
- A Sunset Boulevard restaurant in Aarhus, Denmark
- Industry: Restaurants
- Founded: 1996; 30 years ago in Odense, Denmark
- Headquarters: Kolding, Denmark
- Number of locations: 50 (2025)
- Areas served: Denmark; Faroe Islands; Greenland; Germany
- Key people: Jens Baisner (CEO)
- Owner: KD Selskaberne
- Number of employees: 1,600 (2025)
- Website: sunset-boulevard.dk

Sunset Boulevard, also known as just Sunset, is a Danish-owned fast-food chain. Founded in 1996, the chain has 50 restaurants across Denmark, the Faroe Islands, Greenland and one location in Germany.

== History ==
Sunset Boulevard were founded in 1996, when businessman Jeppe Droob opened his first sandwich shop in Odense. Droob is part of a well-known business family from west Jutland; his father Keld founded the Dansk Discount chain, later Fakta. Originally mainly focused on sandwiches, they now predominantly sell burgers, though sandwiches remain on their menu. The chain previously used the slogan "fedtfattig på den fede måde" ("low fat in the fat way") but were ordered to stop using the slogan in 2008 by the Danish Veterinary and Food Administration.

The company moved their headquarters from Esbjerg to Kolding in 2018. The same year, Droob handed over chairmanship of the company to Morten Pedersen. In 2025, the company fired their CEO Jens Broch, replacing him with Jens Baisner. In 2020, the chain launched a subscription service providing discounts to those who signed up.

Amidst the 2025 United States boycott, the chain dropped the Ben and Jerry's Cookie Dough milkshake from their restaurants. As of 2025, the company had approximately 1,600 employees.

=== Locations ===
Sunset Boulevard are the largest Danish-owned fast food chain with 50 locations, primarily in Denmark but also three locations in Greenland and one each in the Faroe Islands and Germany. In 2021, then-CEO Jens Broch announced his intention to open a number of Sunset Boulevard locations in Norway.
