= Franz Waxman =

German film composer (1906–1967)

- Waxman in the 1930s
- Born: Franz Wachsmann; December 24, 1906; Königshütte, Upper Silesia, German Empire (now Chorzów, Poland)
- Died: February 24, 1967 (aged 60); Los Angeles, California, United States
- Era: 20th century

Franz Waxman (né Wachsmann; December 24, 1906 – February 24, 1967) was a German-born composer and conductor of Jewish descent, known primarily for his work in the film music genre. His film scores include Bride of Frankenstein, Rebecca, Sunset Boulevard, A Place in the Sun, Stalag 17, Rear Window, Peyton Place, The Nun's Story, and Taras Bulba. He received 12 Academy Award nominations and won two Oscars in consecutive years (for Sunset Boulevard and A Place in the Sun). He also received a Golden Globe Award for the former film. Bernard Herrmann said that the score for Taras Bulba was "the score of a lifetime."

He also composed concert works, including the oratorio Joshua (1959), and The Song of Terezín (1964–65), a work for orchestra, chorus, and children's chorus based upon poetry written by children in the Theresienstadt concentration camp during World War II. Waxman also founded the Los Angeles Music Festival in 1947 with which he conducted a number of West Coast premieres by fellow film composers and concert composers alike.

== Biography ==
=== Early life (1906–1934) ===
Waxman was born Franz Wachsmann (German: [ˈvaksman]) in Königshütte to Jewish parents in the German Empire's Prussian Province of Silesia (now Chorzów, Poland). At the age of three, Waxman suffered a serious eye injury involving boiling water tipped from a stove, which left his vision permanently impaired.

In 1923, at age 16, Waxman enrolled in the Dresden Music Academy and studied composition and conducting. Waxman lived from the money he made playing popular music and managed to put himself through school. While working as a pianist with the Weintraub Syncopators, a dance band, Waxman met Frederick Hollander, who eventually introduced Waxman to the eminent conductor Bruno Walter.

Waxman worked as an orchestrator for the German film industry, including on Hollander's score for The Blue Angel (1930). One of his first dramatic scores was for the film Liliom (1934). That year, Waxman suffered a severe beating by Nazi sympathizers in Berlin that led him to leave Germany and move with his wife first to Paris, and soon after to Hollywood.

=== Film music and the Los Angeles Music Festival (1935–1949) ===
In Hollywood, Waxman met James Whale, who had been highly impressed by Waxman's score for Liliom. The success of his score for Whale's Bride of Frankenstein (1935) led to the young composer's appointment as Head of Music at Universal Studios. Waxman, however, was more interested in composition than musical direction for film, and in 1936, he left Universal to become a composer at MGM. Waxman scored a number of pictures during the next few years, but the score for Alfred Hitchcock's Rebecca (1940) made his name. Waxman was frequently called to work on scores of horror or suspense films, and Rebecca was the culmination of the genre for Waxman.

Rebecca was Hitchcock's first Hollywood film as part of his contract with David O. Selznick, and thus it was the first time he was allowed a full symphonic score. Selznick financed the film at the same time as he was making Gone With the Wind. Waxman's score for Rebecca is eerie and ethereal, often setting the mood and as Jack Sullivan put it, becoming a "soundboard for the subconscious."

In 1943, Waxman left MGM and moved to Warner Bros., where he worked alongside such great film composers as Max Steiner and Erich Wolfgang Korngold. A period of extended composition followed, including such films as Mr. Skeffington (1944) and Objective, Burma! (1945). A climactic scene in Objective, Burma! was scored fugally, and this would become one of Waxman's trademarks, returning in The Spirit of St. Louis (1957) and Taras Bulba (1962).

In 1947, Waxman formed the Los Angeles Music Festival, for which he served as music director and conductor for the rest of his life. Waxman's goal with the LA Music Festival was to bring the thriving town to "European cultural standards", according to Tony Thomas. In addition to performing the work of great masters such as Stravinsky, he also collaborated with his colleagues, such as Miklós Rózsa, conducting his Violin Concerto.

=== Post-war film scores (1947–1959) ===
By 1947, Waxman had left Warner Bros., to become a freelance film composer, taking only the jobs he wanted rather than being appointed by the studio. Waxman scored the film Sorry, Wrong Number (1948), which climaxes with the use of a passacaglia, highlighting Waxman's highly inventive use of unusual musical forms in film. Waxman had used classical forms before: the climactic "Creation" cue from The Bride of Frankenstein (1935), as Christopher Palmer expresses it, "is in effect a fantasia on one note."

His work on Sunset Boulevard (1950) led to an Academy Award. The score is fast-paced and powerful, using various techniques to highlight the insanity of Norma Desmond, including low, pulsing notes (first heard in The Bride of Frankenstein) and frequent trills. According to Mervyn Cooke, Richard Strauss's opera Salome was the inspiration for the wild trills heard during Desmond's insane final performance.

Waxman received a second consecutive Oscar for A Place in the Sun (1951). However, while awards for film music highlighted the beginning of the 1950s, Waxman now began to write serious works for the concert hall. The Sinfonietta for Strings and Timpani came in 1955, and 1959 had the completion of Waxman's oratorio Joshua. Composed to commemorate the death of Waxman's wife, Joshua with its strong Hebrew influences and extensive use of form is a powerful example of Waxman's compositional powers by the end of the 1950s.

=== Later life (1960–1967) ===
Waxman's later life saw continuing growth of his reputation as a composer. Christopher Palmer wrote that at the time of his death in 1967, "Waxman was at the zenith of his powers." Waxman's output in the 1960s was perhaps more subdued than that which came before it, but he did write Taras Bulba in 1962. Waxman worked on several television shows, including Gunsmoke, in 1966.

The Song of Terezín (1964–65) was based upon poetry by children trapped in the Nazi's Theresienstadt concentration camp. Perhaps Waxman's deep spiritual connection to the subject came from his own encounters with Nazism on a Berlin street in 1934, but whatever the reason for Waxman's deep commitment to the subject, The Song of Terezín stands as the exemplary work of the composer's life. The work is composed for mixed chorus, children's chorus, soprano soloist, and orchestra.

Waxman died from cancer in February 1967, two months after his 60th birthday. His legacy contains over 150 film scores and an abundant collection of concert works.

=== Legacy ===
Some of Waxman's music has been featured on commercial recordings, both on LP and CD. Charles Gerhardt and the National Philharmonic Orchestra played highlights from various Waxman scores for an RCA Victor recording in the early 1970s that utilized Dolby surround sound. Twenty years later, Australian composer and conductor Richard Mills (b. 1949) recorded an anthology of film suites with the Queensland Symphony for the record label Varèse-Sarabande (VSD5242/5257/5480/5713), which were (as the Gerhardt above) produced by George Korngold, son of Erich Wolfgang Korngold, a colleague of Waxman's, as well as another pioneer of the "Hollywood sound". The music for Taras Bulba has been recorded by the [City of Prague Philharmonic/Nic Raine, on 2 cd Tadlow013-2]

The American Film Institute ranked Waxman's score for Sunset Boulevard as number 16 on its list of the greatest film scores. His scores for these films were also nominated for the list:

- Bride of Frankenstein (1935)
- Dr. Jekyll and Mr. Hyde (1941)
- The Nun's Story (1959)
- Peyton Place (1957)
- The Philadelphia Story (1940)
- A Place in the Sun (1951)
- Rebecca (1940)
- Sayonara (1957)
- The Spirit of St. Louis (1957)
- Taras Bulba (1962)

== Filmography ==
- Burglars (1930)
- The Man in Search of His Murderer (1931)
- The Song of Life (1931)
- Caught in the Act (1931)
- Scampolo (1932)
- The First Right of the Child (1932)
- The Empress and I (1933)
- The Only Girl (1933)
- Greetings and Kisses, Veronika (1933)
- Liliom (1934)
- Mauvaise Graine (1934)
- The Crisis is Over (1934)
- Dédé (1935)
- Bride of Frankenstein (1935)
- Flash Gordon (serial, stock music from Bride of Frankenstein, 1936)
- Fury (1936)
- The Invisible Ray (1936)
- The Devil-Doll (1936)
- Captains Courageous (1937)
- Flash Gordon's Trip to Mars (serial, stock music from Bride of Frankenstein, 1938)
- A Christmas Carol (1938)
- The Adventures of Huckleberry Finn (1939)
- The Young in Heart (1938, 2 Academy Award nominations)
- On Borrowed Time (1939)
- Lady of the Tropics (1939)
- Flash Gordon Conquers the Universe (serial, stock music from Bride of Frankenstein, 1940)
- Strange Cargo (1940)
- Rebecca (1940, Academy Award nomination)
- Boom Town (1940)
- The Philadelphia Story (1940)
- Suspicion (1941, Academy Award nomination)
- Dr. Jekyll and Mr. Hyde (1941, Academy Award nomination)
- Woman of the Year (1942)
- Her Cardboard Lover (1942)
- Edge of Darkness (1943)
- Destination Tokyo (1943)
- Air Force (1943)
- To Have and Have Not (1944, uncredited)
- Mr. Skeffington (1944)
- Objective, Burma! (1945, Academy Award nomination)
- Hotel Berlin (1945)
- Humoresque (1946, Academy Award nomination)
- Possessed (1947)
- That Hagen Girl (1947)
- Cry Wolf (1947)
- The Paradine Case (1947)
- Sorry, Wrong Number (1948)
- Alias Nick Beal (1949)
- Night Unto Night (1949)
- Johnny Holiday (1949)
- Sunset Boulevard (1950) (Academy Award)
- The Furies (1950)
- Night and the City (1950)
- Dark City (1950)
- The Blue Veil (1951)
- He Ran All the Way (1951)
- Anne of the Indies (1951)
- A Place in the Sun (1951) (Academy Award)
- Red Mountain (1951)
- Decision Before Dawn (1951)
- Phone Call from a Stranger (1952)
- Come Back, Little Sheba (1952)
- My Cousin Rachel (1952)
- Botany Bay (1953)
- Stalag 17 (1953)
- Demetrius and the Gladiators (1954)
- Elephant Walk (1954)
- Prince Valiant (1954)
- Rear Window (1954)
- The Silver Chalice (1954) (Academy Award nomination)
- Mister Roberts (1955)
- Untamed (1955)
- Miracle in the Rain (1956)
- Peyton Place (1957)
- Sayonara (1957)
- The Spirit of St. Louis (1957)
- Run Silent, Run Deep (1958)
- The Nun's Story (1959) (Academy Award nomination)
- Sunrise at Campobello (1960)
- Cimarron (1960)
- Return to Peyton Place (1961)
- The Big Bankroll (1961)
- My Geisha (1962)
- Hemingway's Adventures of a Young Man (1962)
- Taras Bulba (1962, Academy Award nomination)
- Lost Command (1966)
- The Raid (1966) Gunsmoke episodes 11.18 & 11.19
- The Longest Hundred Miles (1967)

== Selected concert works ==
- Carmen Fantasie (1946), for violin and orchestra
- Rhapsody for Piano and Orchestra (1947)
- Tristan and Isolde Fantasy, for violin, piano and orchestra
- Four Scenes from Childhood (1948), for violin and piano (written for Jascha Heifetz on the occasion of the birth of his son Jay)
- Auld Lang Syne Variations (1947), for violin and chamber ensemble. Movements: "Eine kleine Nichtmusik," "Moonlight Concerto," "Chaconne a son gout," and "Hommage to Shostakofiev."
- The Song of Terezín (1964–65), based on poems by children of Theresienstadt concentration camp
- Joshua (1959), Oratorio
