= July 1967 =

Month of 1967

<<	July 1967					>>
Su	Mo	Tu	We	Th	Fr	Sa
						1
2	3	4	5	6	7	8
9	10	11	12	13	14	15
16	17	18	19	20	21	22
23	24	25	26	27	28	29
30	31

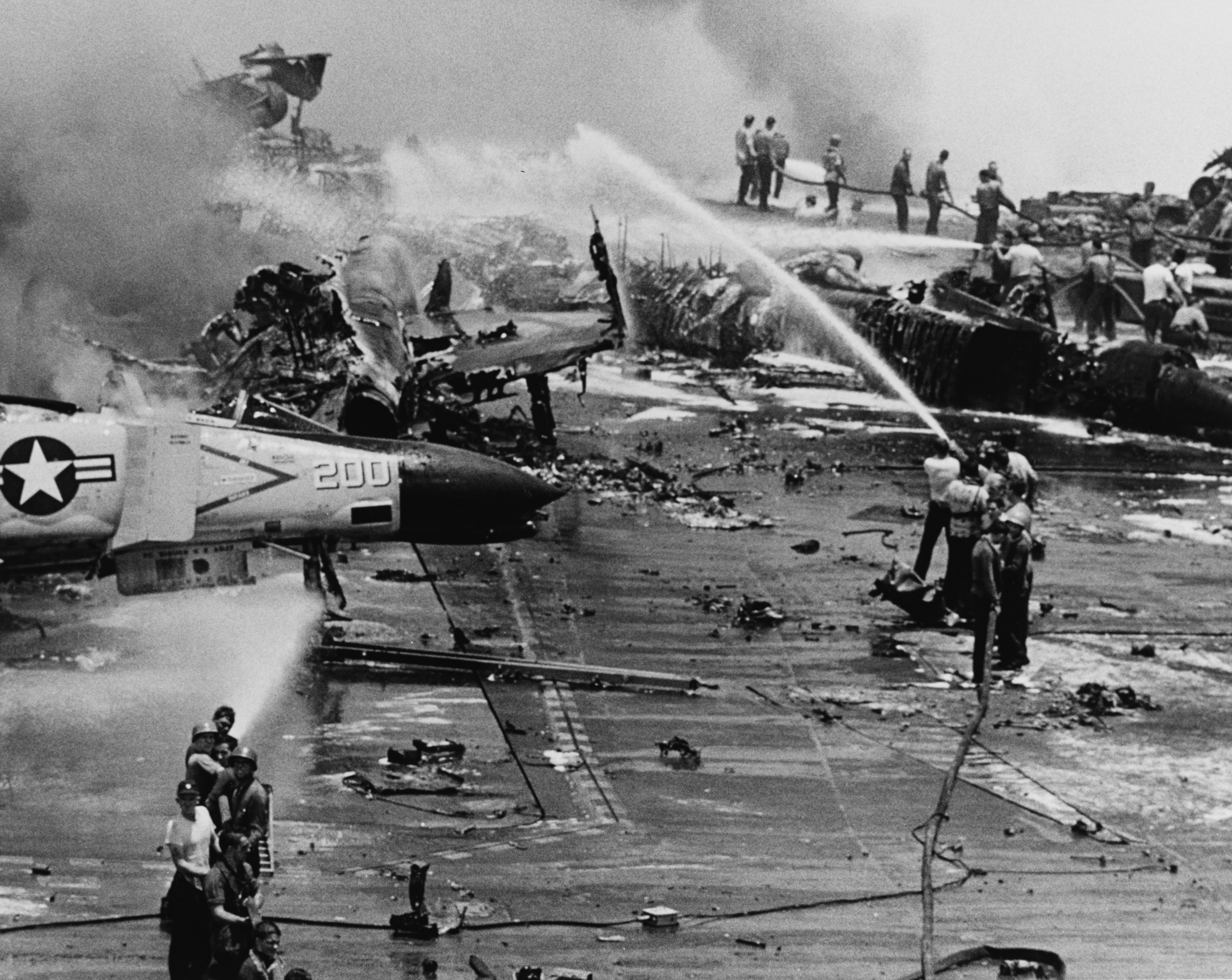
July 29, 1967: 134 men killed in explosion and fire on the USS Forrestal

The following events occurred in July 1967:

== July 1, 1967 (Saturday) ==
- The first colour television broadcasts in the United Kingdom began at 2:00 in the afternoon as BBC Two telecast a match from Centre Court of Wimbledon between Cliff Drysdale and Roger Taylor. "It was a Wimbledon no one has ever seen on television before", a reporter noted the next day. "The clothes of the players were whiter than white, the Centre Court an inimitable green." Regular colour programming, a full colour service would begin on BBC2 on December 2.
- Canada celebrated its first one hundred years of Confederation. In honor of the centennial, Queen Elizabeth II visited from London and addressed 25,000 of her Canadian subjects in front of the Parliament Building in Ottawa and expressed her hope that Canada's next 100 years would "bring peace and prosperity, happiness and harmony, and a just reward for the work and endeavor of each one of you."
- The Seaboard Air Line Railroad merged with Atlantic Coast Line Railroad, to form the Seaboard Coast Line Railroad (SCL), nine years after the two lines had applied to the Interstate Commerce Commission for permission to join as one company. In 1980, the SCL would merge with the Chessie System railroad conglomerate to create today's CSX Transportation.
- American Samoa's first constitution became effective, with the U.S. territory having limited legislative power to make laws through a 20-member House of Representatives (elected by popular vote), and an 18-member Senate (selected by a meeting of Samoan tribal chiefs).
- The People's Republic of China announced the ouster of President Liu Shaoqi, in an article in the Communist Party journal Red Flag. Liu, who had believed at one time to be the eventual successor of Mao Zedong, had not been seen in public since 1966.
- Fidel Sánchez Hernández began a five-year term as the new President of El Salvador, succeeding Julio Adalberto Rivera.
- Born: Pamela Anderson, Canadian-born American actress; in Ladysmith, British Columbia
- Died: Gerhard Ritter, 79, German historian

== July 2, 1967 (Sunday) ==
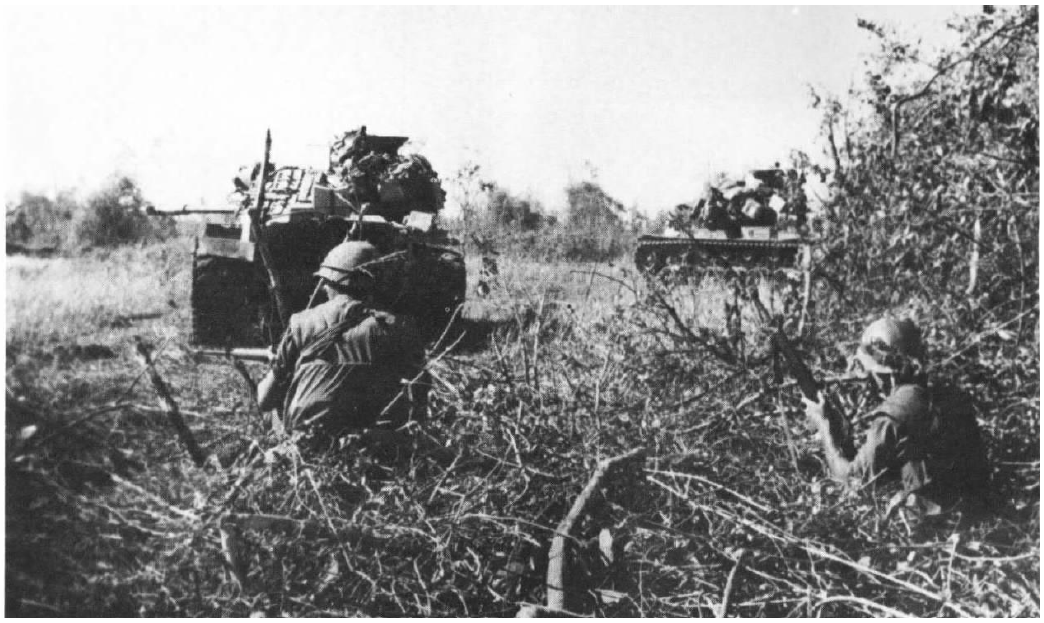
July 2, 1967: Operation Buffalo

- "Operation Buffalo" began with the worst single-day loss suffered by the United States Marines during the Vietnam War. While patrolling the area around Con Thien in the Quảng Trị Province, near South Vietnam's border with North Vietnam, the 400 members of Alpha Company and Bravo Company of the 1st Battalion, 9th Marines were ambushed by the North Vietnamese Army; 84 were killed, nine were missing and 190 were wounded for a total of 283 casualties. The total number of deaths in the operation would be 159 Americans and 1,290 of the North Vietnamese during the seven days between July 2 and July 8.
- The newly activated Vela 3 and Vela 4 satellites, activated in May to monitor Soviet nuclear testing by detecting gamma rays, recorded the first of many gamma-ray bursts of unknown origin, starting at 14:19 UTC. When the Vela satellites began picking up similar bursts every two weeks, "U.S. authorities were worried, but they soon realised that neither China nor the Soviet Union could test nuclear weapons every other week"; nearly 30 years later, on February 28, 1997, improved satellite technology would confirm that the gamma-ray bursts came from other galaxies, producing "the most violent explosions known to mankind" that "emit more energy in a few seconds than our Sun will generate in its entire lifetime."
- Parliamentary elections were held in East Germany for the 434 seats in the unicameral Volkskammer from a list of candidates drawn up by the National Front. "Some 583 candidates contested the 434 seats to be filled, which thus gave voters the possibility of striking out certain names on polling day if they wished to do so", but since only 8,005 of the 11,205,270 votes were against the Front's list "under the terms of the electoral law, only those whose names appeared at the top of the list were elected".
- The government of Israel announced that Palestinian Arab refugees, who had fled their homes in the West Bank after its invasion in June, would be allowed to return to their homes, but that they would only have until August 10 to do so. Between 80,000 and 150,000 residents had fled across the Jordan River during and after the Six-Day War, and were in camps in Jordan. The government announced, however, that anyone who crossed into Jordan after July 4 would not be allowed to return at all.
- In London, diplomat Yaakov Herzog of Israel conducted the first of his secret peace negotiation discussions with King Hussein of Jordan since the end of the Six-Day War.

== July 3, 1967 (Monday) ==
- Twenty-three of 42 entombed miners in the Philippines were rescued alive, five days after a cave-in had sealed them 4,300 feet underground. The men, employed by the Philex Mining Corporation to extract gold and copper from the deep mine near Baguio, were sealed in when heavy rains from a typhoon buried the mine entrances in a landslide. One of the men would die soon after being brought out, and the bodies of the remaining 19 would be brought out later.
- Norwell Gumbs began duty with the Metropolitan Police Service as the first non-white policeman in London. Gumbs, a 21-year old British citizen originally from the West Indies, had started training on March 29, and was assigned to the West End Central Police Station. He would later change his surname to Roberts because of the frequent misspelling of the surname "Gumbs".
- Born: Brian Cashman, American baseball executive; in Rockville Centre, New York

== July 4, 1967 (Tuesday) ==
- After a bitter all-night debate, the British House of Commons voted 99 to 14 to approve the Sexual Offences Act 1967, decriminalizing homosexuality in England and Wales. The law, which would receive royal assent on July 27, removed penalties only for relations between gay men over the age of 21. Sexual relations between lesbians were still prohibited, and the law did not apply to Scotland or to Northern Ireland. Moreover, the change in the law did not apply to the armed forces or to the merchant marines, and while the age of consent for heterosexual relations was 16 years old, the law still penalized homosexual acts involving anyone 20 years old or younger.
- The formal coronation ceremony for King Tāufaʻāhau Tupou IV of Tonga took place at a chapel in Nukuʻalofa, on the monarch's 49th birthday. Tonga's royal chaplain, Reverend George Harris of Australia, placed the crown upon the king's head. Tupou had been Prime Minister of Tonga since 1946 and had been head of state of the British protectorate since the death of his mother, Queen Salote, on December 16, 1965.
- For the first time in major league baseball history, two brothers faced each other as starting pitchers. Phil Niekro, 28, pitched for the Atlanta Braves, who were hosting the Chicago Cubs, who started with Joe Niekro, 22, in the first game of a doubleheader. Joe pitched three innings, while Phil pitched the entire game in an 8–3 win that ended the Cubs' seven-game winning streak. In 1924, Jesse Barnes had come in as a relief pitcher for the Brooklyn Dodgers in a 7–6 win over a New York Yankees team whose pitcher was his brother Virgil Barnes.
- Hundreds of Muslim and Christian citizens of Bethlehem, known for being the birthplace of Jesus Christ and captured from Jordan during the Six-Day War, petitioned the Israeli government to ask that their city be formally annexed into Israel. While Israel had annexed a large part of the territory west of the Jordan River, Bethlehem had been excluded.

== July 5, 1967 (Wednesday) ==
- A group of 1,500 soldiers in the Democratic Republic of the Congo, led by 11 white soldiers of fortune under the command of mercenary Jean Schramme of Belgium, mutinied and attacked Camp Ntele, a military base outside of Stanleyville, and massacred 400 people (including families of the soldiers killed). The uprising against President Joseph Mobutu would kill at least 2,000 people before being suppressed on November 5. Other troops from Schramme's group came across the border from neighboring Rwanda and took control of the border city of Bukavu.
- A group of three university presidents, three university vice-presidents, and four university library directors met on the campus of Ohio State University to hear the proposal of Frederick G. Kilgour to implement the first plan for an online computer network of library holdings, the Ohio College Library Center, OCLC. OCLC would later expand beyond Ohio and change its name, though not its initials, to Online Computer Library Center.
- With the approval by its people on March 19 for a continued association with France, the colony of French Somaliland renamed itself as an overseas territory, with representation in France's National Assembly and its Senate as the French Territory of the Afars and the Issas. It would become an independent nation on June 27, 1977, as Djibouti.
- Died: Bruce Barton, 80, American advertising executive and co-founder (in 1918) of the Barton, Durstine & Osborn agency that merged with in 1928 with the George Batten agency to create BBDO, the world's largest advertising agency. Besides serving as a Congressman for Tennessee and creating the character of Betty Crocker for General Mills, Barton also wrote the controversial bestseller The Man Nobody Knows: A Discovery of the Real Jesus, in which he described Jesus Christ as "the greatest salesman who ever walked the Earth".

== July 6, 1967 (Thursday) ==
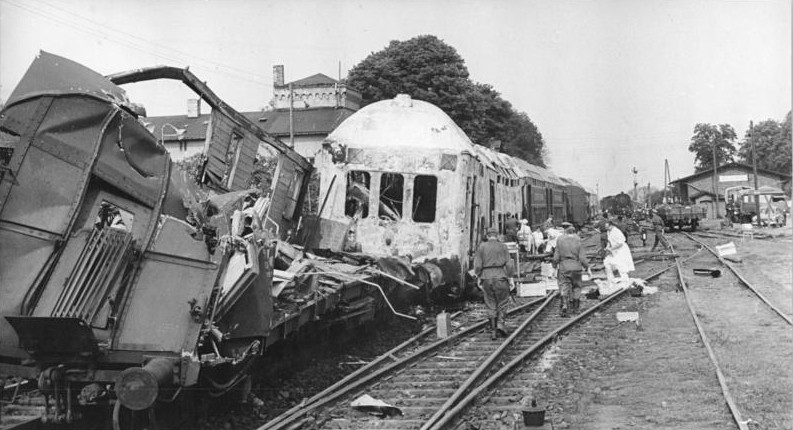
July 6, 1967: Aftermath of the Langenweddingen level crossing disaster

- A railway crash killed 94 people, mostly children at a crossing in East Germany at the town of Langenweddingen, seven miles southwest of Magdeburg. The double-decker train collided with a gasoline truck that was stopped on the railroad tracks.
- In Thailand, 43 people were killed and dozens injured in the city of Korat when the driver of the bus they were on pulled into the path of an oncoming express train. Most of the victims were women and children. According to Thai officials, 86 passengers were inside the bus, and 10 were riding on top. Survivors said that when the driver realized that he would be unable to stop, he opened the door and jumped to safety before the bus rolled into the path of the train.
- Nigerian forces invaded the secessionist Southern Region, which had declared its independence as the Republic of Biafra on May 30, beginning the Nigerian Civil War. Before the war's end on January 13, 1970, between one and three million Nigerian Biafrans would die, most of them from starvation, along with several hundred thousand Nigerians. The first attacks were at Ogoja and Nsukka and the towns of Obudu and Obolo were captured the next day.
- Died:
  - U.S. Air Force Major General William J. Crumm, 47, was one of six people killed when the B-52 bomber he was on collided with another B-52 over the South China Sea. Major General Crumm, who was accompanying the crew on a bombing raid, became the highest ranking U.S. casualty of the Vietnam War as a result of the accident.
  - General Nguyen Chi Thanh, 53, military strategist for North Vietnam's operations in South Vietnam, died of a heart attack hours after getting final approval for the planned 1968 Tet Offensive from North Vietnam's President Ho Chi Minh and NVA General Võ Nguyên Giáp.
  - Hilda Taba, 64, Estonian-born American educator

== July 7, 1967 (Friday) ==
- Ann Pellegreno, "The Flying Housewife", landed in Oakland, California, four weeks after she and her crew of three set off to fly around the world following the flight plan that Amelia Earhart and Fred Noonan had used on their ill-fated flight in 1937. Pellegreno had taken off from Oakland on June 9 in a Lockheed Model 10-E Electra, similar to the Model 10-A Electra used by Earhart, and completed a 28,000 mile journey. The landing came a little more than 30 years after Earhart and Noonan had disappeared on July 2, 1937.
- Pan American Flight 100 from New York landed in London, becoming the first commercial airline flight to make a fully automatic landing without the intervention of the crew. The three-engine Boeing 727 used the new Precision Approach and Landing System (PALS), guided by signals from Heathrow Airport. The 111 passengers on board Pan Am 100 were not informed until after the "no hands" landing, but applauded the announcement.
- "All You Need Is Love", which had been premiered before a live worldwide audience on the Our World special program, was released as a 45 rpm record in the United Kingdom; it would be released in the United States on July 17.
- Born: Tom Kristensen, Denmark professional racing driver with six consecutive wins (and nine overall) of the 24 Hours of Le Mans race; in Hobro

== July 8, 1967 (Saturday) ==
- The American Independent Party, the last political party, outside of the Democrats and Republicans, to win electoral votes in a U.S. presidential election, was founded by a group of conservatives in Bakersfield, California. For the 1968 election, the AIP would nominate Alabama Governor George C. Wallace for President, and would receive 13.5% of the popular vote and 46 electoral votes from five states (Arkansas, Louisiana, Mississippi, Georgia, and Alabama).
- The nova HR Delphini was observed on Earth for the first time, by English amateur astronomer G. E. D. Alcock, initially at an apparent magnitude of 5.6 and was "remarkable for its slow development... lasting more than a year" allowing it to be "one of the most widely observed modern novae". "HR Del" would reach a peak magnitude (3.5) on December 13, steadily drop, then rise again to a peak of 4.2 on May 5, 1968. With a distance of at least 2,938 light years and perhaps as many as 3141 the star at HR Delphini had gone nova at least as far back as the 10th century BC.
- American athlete Jim Ryun, who already held the world record for the fastest run of the mile, broke the record for the 1,500 meters at a meet in Los Angeles. Ryun's mark of 3 minutes, 33.1 seconds, broke the seven-year-old record of 3:35.6 set by Herb Elliott.
- Hong Kong was invaded by a mob of 300 people from neighboring China, including armed men in uniform, who poured across the border crossing at Sha Tau Kok. Four Hong Kong policemen were killed by automatic weapons fire, and 11 others injured.
- Born: Jordan Chan, Hong Kong film actor and singer; as Chan Siu-chun in Huizhou, Guangdong, China
- Died: Vivien Leigh, 53, British film actress and winner of two Academy Awards, known for her roles in Gone with the Wind and A Streetcar Named Desire

== July 9, 1967 (Sunday) ==
- Mary Flezar, a 19-year-old student at Eastern Michigan University (EMU), became the first of the "Co-Ed Murders", a series of seven murders of female students in southeastern Michigan, ranging in age from 13 to 21. She was abducted and stabbed more than 30 times, and her body would not be discovered for a month. Killings would follow in the summers of 1968 and 1969 before the arrest of John Norman Collins, a student at EMU. Collins would be arrested and sentenced to life imprisonment for the killing of the final victim.
- The supersonic MiG-25 "Foxbat" jet fighter was displayed by the Soviet Union for the first time. Four of the Foxbats flew across the sky, in formation, at an airshow at the Domodedovo air field near Moscow. At the same show, the Soviets sent a formation of ten Sukhoi Su-15 "Flagon" interceptors past the airfield.
- Newly consecrated as Poland's second Roman Catholic cardinal, Archbishop Karol Wojtyla was welcomed back to Kraków from Rome by a cheering crowd of 10,000 people. Wojtyla, a "former chemical factory laborer and worker priest" would become Pope John Paul II eleven years later.
- At least 371 people were killed in Japan when landslides, triggered by heavy rains from Typhoon Billie, hit the western half of the Kyushu island and moved south. Most of the dead were killed by floods and landslides that struck Kobe and Kure.
- The Kagyu Samye Ling Monastery and Tibetan Centre, the first Tibetan Buddhism monastery located outside of Asia, was founded in Scotland at Eskdalemuir. The pioneering monks were Chögyam Trungpa and Akong Rinpoche.
- The Convention on Transit Trade of Land-locked States took effect.
- Died:
  - Fatima Jinnah, 73, Leader of the Opposition in Pakistan's National Assembly, and independence leader and women's rights advocate known to her supporters as Māder-e Millat ("Mother of the Nation").
  - Eugen Fischer, 93, German anthropology professor and a leading exponent of the Nazi German concept of "racial hygiene"
  - Douglas MacLean, 77, American silent film actor billed as "The Man With the Million Dollar Smile"

== July 10, 1967 (Monday) ==
- New Zealand decimalized its currency from the pound to the dollar, with one pound being converted to two dollars, and one new dollar being worth ten shillings. The exchange rate for the New Zealand dollar was $1.40 in American currency.
- "Ode to Billie Joe", one of the most popular songs of 1967, was recorded by songwriter and singer Bobbie Gentry, becoming "a lyrical mystery that puzzled listeners for years".
- Died: Albertine Sarrazin, 29, French novelist, died from a hemorrhage and cardiac arrest during surgery at a hospital in Montpellier for a kidney tumor. Five years later, the surgeon and the anesthetist would be found guilty of negligence, including the failure to have blood available for a transfusion.

== July 11, 1967 (Tuesday) ==
- The Oireachtas, parliament of Ireland, amended the Censorship of Publications Act to provide that the banning of a book by the Censorship of Publications Board would be limited to 12 years. Although the Board retained the right to ban a title again, the amendment "resulted in the unbanning of thousands of books".
- In a referendum, the residents of the West Indies island of Anguilla voted overwhelmingly, by a margin of 1,813 votes to 5, to secede from the Federation of Saint Kitts and Nevis, while still maintaining their associated state relationship with the United Kingdom.
- Born: Jhumpa Lahiri, British-born American novelist and 2000 Pulitzer Prize winner; as Nilanjana Sudeshna in London

== July 12, 1967 (Wednesday) ==
- Five days of rioting that would ultimately claim 23 lives began in Newark, New Jersey. At the corner of 15th Avenue and South Ninth Street, an African-American taxicab driver, John Smith, was arrested by two city police officers, Vito Pontrelli and Oscar De Simone. During the scuffle that followed an argument, Smith sustained a broken rib, and was taken to the 4th Precinct Station House, across the street from the William P. Hayes housing project. At about 9:30 p.m., people saw Smith, who either refused or was unable to walk, being dragged out of a police car and into the front door of the station. As rumors spread that Smith had been killed by the police, an angry crowd assembled outside the police station; the crowd marched toward the Newark City Hall in what started as a nonviolent protest. Within minutes, police and marchers were hit by rocks, an attempt was made to disperse the crowd, and the riot started. When the riot ended on July 17, 21 black residents were dead (including six women and two children), along with a white policeman and a white fireman.
- The capsizing of a boat drowned 230 people who were trying to cross the flooded Ravi River in Pakistan, about 135 miles (217 km) from Lahore. The boat had been carrying members of a large wedding party, along with livestock. According to some of the 40 survivors, the boat's balance was upset as it neared the opposite bank, when camels on the ship panicked.
- On his 20th birthday, Brian Parsons of Nanuet, New York, a Yellowstone National Park concession stand employee, accompanied a group of friends on an excursion to the area of Nez Perce Creek. While swimming illegally in a hot spring, Parsons was burned over 90 percent of his body. He died 12 days later.
- The Interior Ministry of Greece began the process of revoking the citizenship of almost 480 Greeks and confiscating their property, based on charges of "anti-national activities". Among the first nine people punished was actress Melina Mercouri, who was living in New York.
- The U.S. Navy released the report of its naval intelligence investigation of Amelia Earhart's July 2, 1937 disappearance and the subsequent search. The file had been declassified on June 8.
- Born:
  - Luis Abinader, President of the Dominican Republic since 2020; in Santo Domingo
  - John Petrucci, American heavy metal guitarist; in Kings Park, New York

== July 13, 1967 (Thursday) ==
- In an effort to regulate the personality cult that venerated Communist Party Chairman Mao Zedong, the government of the People's Republic of China issued a directive that prohibited the creation of new statues and monuments for Chairman Mao without approval of a central planning commission. Although the intent was to bar construction "unless at the right time and in the right place... the new policy was not effective at all and huge public statues of Mao continued to be constructed everywhere."
- The European Economic Community (EEC) joined with the European Coal and Steel Community (ECSC) and the European Atomic Community (Euratom), to form the European Communities, as the Merger Treaty of April 8, 1965, went into effect. The new entity was governed by a Commission consisting of 14 representatives of the three agencies.
- In the United Kingdom, the Abortion Act 1967 was approved by the House of Commons by a 167–83 margin. It would receive approval of the House of Lords, without significant alteration, on October 26 and given royal assent the next day.
- Died:
  - Tom Simpson, 29, British professional cyclist, suffered a fatal heart attack while competing in the Tour de France, after consuming amphetamines before the 13th stage of the race, then pedaling his way up Mont Ventoux in the July heat.
  - Tommy Lucchese, 67, Italian-born American gangster and leader of the Lucchese crime family, died from a brain tumor

== July 14, 1967 (Friday) ==
- Operation Buffalo ended in South Vietnam after 12 days of fighting that left 159 U.S. Marines dead and 345 wounded for the Marines' heaviest losses during the Vietnam War; the Marines reported that 1,290 of the enemy had been killed.
- The Convention Establishing the World Intellectual Property Organization (referred to as the WIPO Convention) was signed at Stockholm, and would enter into force on April 26, 1970. The WIPO would become a special agency of the United Nations on December 17, 1974.
- The Los Angeles Wolves won the first, and only championship game of the United Soccer Association, 6 to 5 in sudden death overtime, with the game-winning goal credited to the opposing team, the Washington Whips.
- The Bee Gees released Bee Gees' 1st, which went on sale in the United Kingdom. Although it was their third album, it was the first to be distributed in the UK and the United States (where it would be released on August 9). The first two albums had been released only in Australia and New Zealand.
- While the Newark riots were in progress, a separate riot began in the nearby town of Plainfield, New Jersey.
- Born:
  - Mary Woodvine, English TV soap opera actress who portrayed Mary Harkinson on EastEnders; in Hammersmith
  - Patrick J. Kennedy, U.S. Congressman and son of U.S. Senator Ted Kennedy; in Boston
  - Robin Ventura, American baseball player and manager; in Santa Maria, California
- Died: Tudor Arghezi (pen name Ion Theodorescu), 87, Romanian novelist and poet

== July 15, 1967 (Saturday) ==
- For the first time, a settlement was established by Israeli citizens in the Golan Heights, which had been captured from Syria the previous month during the Six-Day War. The settlers took over Aleika, an abandoned Syrian army camp, and created the Merom Golan kibbutz.
- Born:
  - Adam Savage, American industrial engineer and special effects designer best known as the co-host of the TV series MythBusters; in New York City
  - Michael Tse, Hong Kong film and TV actor; as Tse Tin-wah in British Hong Kong

== July 16, 1967 (Sunday) ==
- What would become the landmark case of Katko v. Briney, setting limits to the extent of defending personal property, began near Eddyville, Iowa, when a burglar was seriously injured by a booby trap set up by homeowner Edward Briney. Over the previous ten years, trespassers had broken into an unoccupied house on farm land inherited by Mrs. Briney. On June 11, Mr. Briney rigged a 20-gauge shotgun so that it would fire at anyone who opened the door to the bedroom. Marvin Katko and an accomplice broke into the house to take antiques, and when Katko opened the door, the shotgun blast tore off the lower part of his right leg. Katko would sue, and a jury in Oskaloosa would award him $20,000 in actual damages and $10,000 in punitive damages. Eighty acres of the Brineys' 120 acre farm were sold at a forced auction to pay for the damages, although three neighbors bought the house and held it in trust so that the Brineys would not be forced to move.
- In the municipal elections for councils in cities and villages in Ecuador, almost 10,000 voters turned in flyers that were "the same size and color as the official ballots", and had a box that could be checked, but which were actually advertisements for Pulvapies, a brand of foot powder. The ballot-like paper had the words "Vote for any candidate, but if you want well-being and hygiene, vote for Pulvapies!", and in the town of Picoazá, more "votes" were cast for Pulvapies than for any candidates for the town council. Whether the advertisements were put in the ballot box to protest against the voting process, or out of confusion, they were declared invalid. Prosecutors considered charging the manufacturer with interference in the electoral process.
- In the village of Marzabotto in northern Italy, survivors and families of the victims of the October 1944 Marzabotto massacre voted on the fate of former German Army Major Walter Reder, who had been sentenced to life imprisonment in 1951 for ordering the killing of 300 townspeople. From his prison cell in Gaeta, Reder had written to Marzabotto's municipal council, expressing his remorse and asking for support for his petition for a release so that he could be with his ailing mother in West Germany. Of 288 eligible people who cast ballots, four voted for forgiveness, and 282 voted against it; two others cast blank papers.
- An explosion and fire killed 37 inmates at a prison camp near Jay, Florida. According to survivors, the accident happened after two convicts at Road Camp 12 began a fistfight and 49 other prisoners in the barracks watched. During the altercation, a natural gas line was broken and a fluorescent lamp ignited the gas, setting the wooden structure ablaze. One of the guards, A. O. Lovett, opened the locked barracks door and pushed five inmates out, despite minor burns. In all, ten of the 51 prisoners got outside, but two of them died of their injuries.
- The Jet Propulsion Laboratory at Pasadena, California, lost contact with Surveyor 4 while the American lunar probe was making its descent to the Sinus Medii crater on the Moon. The spacecraft, launched three days earlier, "was supposed to demonstrate the soft-landing technology to be used on Apollo landers", stopped transmitting shortly before 9:00 p.m. California time (0500 UTC on July 17) when it was eight miles above the lunar surface, shortly before three small rockets were to have slowed it from 300 miles an hour to a soft landing, and was presumed to have crashed.
- In Yugoslavia's Republic of Macedonia, the Macedonian Orthodox Church declared its independence (autocephaly) from the Serbian Orthodox Church that governed Orthodox Christians in the rest of Yugoslavia. Serbian Orthodox Bishop Dimitrije Stojković was proclaimed as Dositej, Metropolitan of Skopje, to govern the separatist archdiocese.
- Born:
  - Will Ferrell, American comedian and film actor; as John William Ferrell in Irvine, California
  - Mihaela Stanulet, Romanian gymnast and 1984 Olympic gold medalist; in Sibiu
- Died: Edward Chamberlin, 68, American economist and author of The Theory of Monopolistic Competition

== July 17, 1967 (Monday) ==
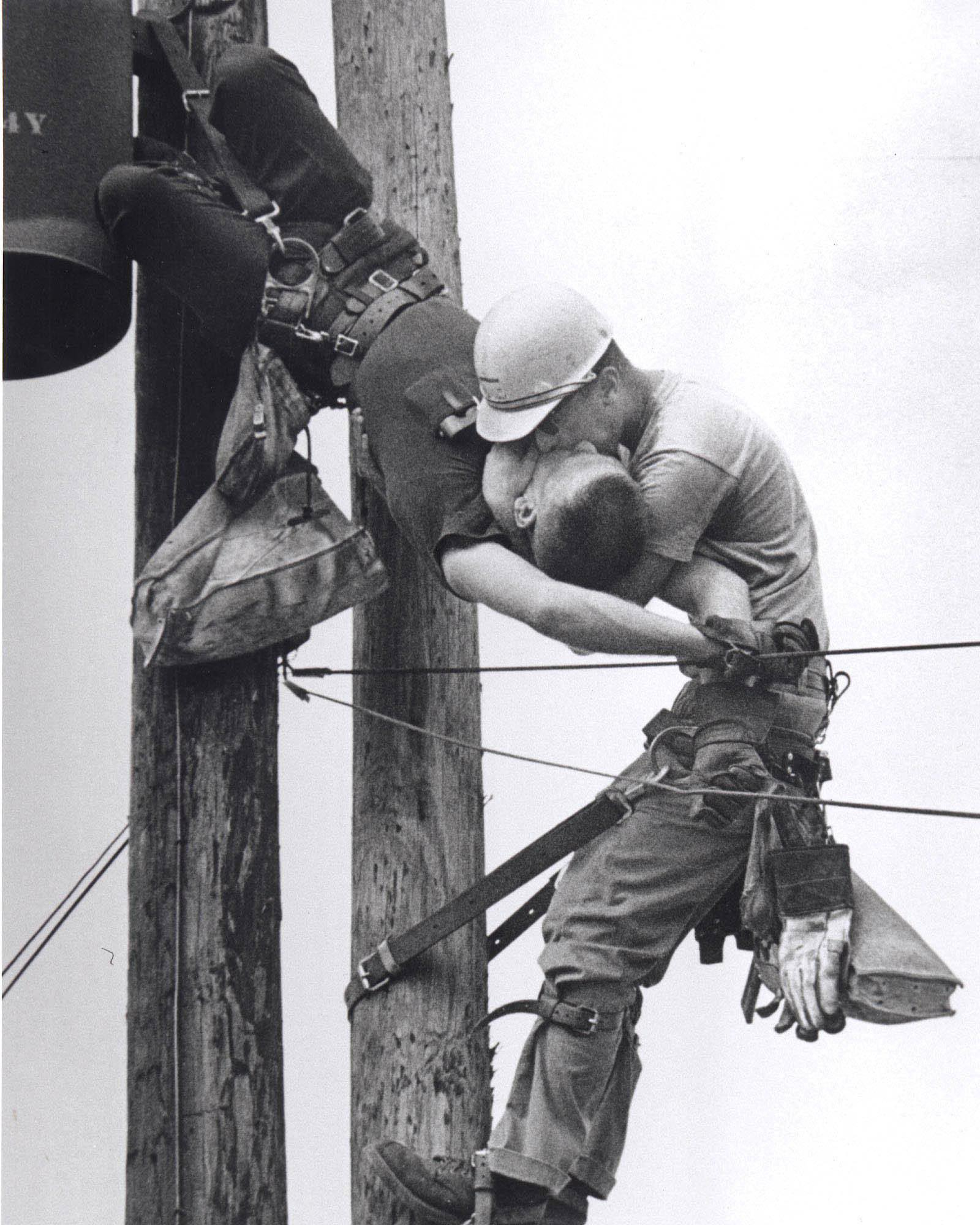
July 17, 1967: The Kiss of Life

- In Jacksonville, Florida, American photographer Rocco Morabito photographed Jacksonville Electric Authority lineworker J. D. Thompson giving mouth-to-mouth resuscitation to fellow lineman Randall Champion, who had contacted a 4,160-volt line. Champion survived and lived until 2002. Morabito's photo, titled The Kiss of Life, would win the 1968 Pulitzer Prize for Spot News Photography.
- Less than three months after his April 23 escape from prison in Missouri, James Earl Ray crossed into Canada, eventually settling in Toronto, where he would steal the identities of three similar-looking men. Ray would obtain identifications and passports under the names of Toronto citizens Eric Galt, Paul Bridgman and Ramon Sneyd.
- In a popular cultural event in Havana, 100 artists from around the world painted the Mural Cuba Colectiva during a live television event shown in Cuba, the Soviet Union, and Soviet-allied nations in Eastern Europe.
- Two days after a renewed war between the United Arab Republic (Egypt) and Israel, both sides accepted a cease-fire proposal by the United Nations.
- Died: John Coltrane, 40, African-American jazz composer and saxophonist, died from liver cancer.

== July 18, 1967 (Tuesday) ==
- The discovery of the preserved ruins of an ancient Minoan civilization city was announced by a team of Greek and American archaeologists on the Greek island of Santorini, referred to in classic Greek literature as Thera. Akrotiri, located near the modern village of the same name, had been buried by a cataclysmic volcanic eruption estimated to have occurred around the year 1628 BC. The volcanic eruption may have been the inspiration of the legend of Atlantis, repeated by Plato in his dialogues Timaeus and Critias in the 4th Century BC.
- The National Assembly of South Vietnam gave final approval to 11 different president and vice-president teams for the September 3 national election, while rejecting seven other proposed tickets. What would be the winning ticket in the September election, with Chief of State Nguyễn Văn Thiệu for President and Prime Minister Nguyễn Cao Kỳ for Vice President, was approved by a 54-16 vote, while the candidacy of former president Dương Văn Minh was rejected.
- Denis Healey, Minister of Defence for the United Kingdom, announced the closing of its military bases in Malaysia and Singapore, with half of its 80,000 troops to be pulled out by 1970, and a complete withdrawal by 1977.
- Born: Vin Diesel (stage name for Mark Sinclair Vincent), American film actor; in New York City
- Died: Humberto Castelo Branco, 69, recently retired as President of Brazil, was killed in an airplane crash just four months after completing his term. The former Brazilian army marshal had been flying back to his home in Fortaleza after a brief visit to a ranch, and was in a small Cessna plane with five other people when a Brazilian Air Force T-33 trainer jet clipped the Cessna with its wingtip.

== July 19, 1967 (Wednesday) ==
- Eighty-two people were killed in a collision between Piedmont Airlines Flight 22 and a Cessna 310 near Hendersonville, North Carolina. The Piedmont flight, with multiple stops, had originated in Atlanta with a final destination of Washington, D.C.; 52 passengers had boarded the Boeing 727 at Asheville including John T. McNaughton, who had been confirmed by the U.S. Senate as the U.S. Secretary of the Navy and who was scheduled to take office on August 1. The Piedmont flight took off at 11:58 a.m. with 74 passengers and a crew of five. The Cessna was piloted by David Addison who was approaching Asheville with two businessmen, but was 12 miles (19 km) off of his planned flight path. At an altitude of 4,000 feet (1,200 m), at 12:01:18 p.m., the two planes collided "nose to nose" and went down together as a single piece of wreckage which continued for another minute before it exploded; according to one eyewitness, bodies inside were "falling like confetti".
- A race riot broke out in the north side of Minneapolis, on Plymouth Avenue, during the Minneapolis Aquatennial parade. Businesses were vandalized and fires were set, but the disturbance was quelled within hours. The next day a shooting set off another incident in the same area that would lead to the setting of 18 fires, the injury of 25 people, and damages totaling $4.2 million, and violent incidents would occur there again over the next two weeks.
- Forty-two of the 77 people on board an Air Madagascar DC-4 were killed when the plane crashed during its takeoff from Tananarive and crashed into a nearby swamp. There were 35 survivors from the flight that was traveling to Diego Suarez (now Antananarivo). The dead included former Malagasy Republic Foreign Minister Albert Sylla.
- Born: Rageh Omaar, Somalia-born British journalist; in Mogadishu

== July 20, 1967 (Thursday) ==
- The U.S. House of Representatives decided against approving a $40 million program that was intended to exterminate rats in inner city slums over a period of two years, and the measure failed, 176 to 207. President Johnson responded with "an unusually bitter statement", saying that the Congressmen had stricken a "cruel blow to the poor children of America" and complaining that "We are spending federal funds to protect our livestock from rodents and predatory animals. The least we can do is give our children the same protection that we give our livestock."
- Organized crime boss John Roselli was arrested as the FBI brought an end to one of the most sophisticated card-cheating operations in American history, conducted at the Friars Club of California and causing hundreds of thousands of dollars to be swindled from various members of the club. Over a period of five years, Tony Martin, Zeppo Marx, and Phil Silvers were among wealthy celebrities who lost $10,000 or more in games of gin rummy, to opponents who were aided by signals from a person hiding above an air vent.
- The Wuhan Incident began when Chinese General Chen Zaidao ordered the arrest of China's Minister of Public Security, Xie Fuzhi, who had been sent to investigate dissent in the city of Wuhan. Minister Xie and a supervisor of the Cultural Revolution, Wang Li, would be detained for several days and humiliated in a mass rally by members of General Chen's "Million-Strong Army". The response to the "counterrevolutionary rebellion" was the purge of officers and soldiers from China's People's Liberation Army.
- Chilean poet Pablo Neruda was awarded the first Viareggio-Versile prize.
- Born: Courtney Taylor-Taylor, American musician, lead singer of the Dandy Warhols; in Portland, Oregon
- Died:
  - U.S. Army Major Don Steinbrunner, 35, American NFL offensive tackle in 1953, was killed in Vietnam, along with four other people, when his plane was shot down over Kon Tum Province.
  - U.S. Air Force Lieutenant General Lewis H. Brereton, 77, one of the five original military aviators designated by Congress in 1919.

== July 21, 1967 (Friday) ==
- The town of Winneconne, Wisconsin, announced secession from the state of Wisconsin (though not from the United States) because it had not been included in the official maps in an omission from the map "blamed on an artist's oversight", and issued a mock declaration of war. The events, which included the raising of a "state flag", took place while tourists were in town to watch the "midwest regional outboard motor boat races". Town Mayor James Coughlin was named "president" of the new American state, and town chamber of commerce leader Vera Kitchen was proclaimed "prime minister". The secession, which "proved a financial success for the community", ended on July 23 at noon. On August 67, the Wisconsin Highway Commission would announce that it would print a new map in 1967 that would include Winneconne.
- The Supreme Court of Algeria approved an extradition request by the Democratic Republic of the Congo for the return of former Congolese premier Moise Tshombe for execution. Tshombe had been kidnapped from his exile in Spain on June 30 and flown to Algeria. Congo's President Joseph Mobutu commented that Tshombe, who had been sentenced to death in absentia during his exile, would be "executed swiftly and without a trial, and told an interviewer, "He is a man who no longer exists." In November, however, the Algerian government decided not to allow the extradition, citing President Mobutu's refusal to sever ties with Israel and the United States. Tshombe would remain under house arrest in Algiers until his death on June 29, 1969.
- Died:
  - Albert Luthuli, 69, South African anti-apartheid leader, President of the African National Congress since 1952, and 1960 Nobel Peace Prize laureate, was killed when he was struck by a freight train while walking along a railroad track.
  - Basil Rathbone, 75, South African-born British stage, film and radio actor best known for his portrayal of detective Sherlock Holmes in 14 films between 1939 and 1947
  - Jimmie Foxx, 59, American baseball first baseman who hit 534 home runs and was enshrined in the Baseball Hall of Fame, died from a seizure caused by accidental choking.

== July 22, 1967 (Saturday) ==
- Explorer 35, launched by the United States to study and measure "the shadowing effect of the moon on solar electrons", entered lunar orbit and began sending back data. Although its instruments would be switched off by 1973, Explorer 35 would still be orbiting the Moon half a century later.
- A sinkhole caused by the collapse of "a long-abandoned zinc mine" swallowed two houses and several cars in Picher, Oklahoma. Five residents were injured when the Eagle Picher Mining Company shaft, located 260 feet (79 m) below the neighborhood, suddenly gave way.
- An 7.1 magnitude earthquake struck Turkey at 4:57 in the afternoon local time, with an epicenter at the village of Mudurnu.
- Born: Rhys Ifans, Welsh actor and musician; as Rhys Evans in Haverfordwest, Pembrokeshire
- Died: Carl Sandburg, 89, American poet, author, and winner of three Pulitzer Prizes

== July 23, 1967 (Sunday) ==
- The 12th Street Riot, one of the most violent riots in United States history, began in the predominantly African American inner city of Detroit. Over the next five days, 43 people were killed, 1,189 were injured and 7,231 had been arrested; 2,509 buildings were burned with an estimated loss of $36 million in insured property "and undoubtedly millions more were lost by those without insurance, not to mention wages, income and government costs." The triggering event was a raid at 3:50 in the morning on the United Community and Civic League, "an illegal after-hours liquor operation" in an apartment at 9215 Twelfth Street at the corner of 12th and Clairmount. Police from Detroit's 10th Precinct closed six weeks of preparation with the arrest of 82 people who were having a party for two veterans who had recently returned from the Vietnam War. While the police were making the arrests, a crowd had gathered to watch and, "As the last of the prisoners were loaded into cars", a reporter would note later, "someone whose name may never be known... picked an empty bottle off the street and from the protection of the crowd, hurled it toward the building." The bottle smashed the rear window of a squad car, and within moments, more people were throwing bottles, breaking store windows, and looting businesses. "Of the 43 people who were killed", the Kerner Commission would note later, "33 were Negro and 10 were white. Seventeen were looters, of whom two were white. Fifteen citizens (of whom four were white), one white National Guardsman, one white firemen, and one Negro private guard died as the result of gunshot wounds."
- Israel's "Military Order 58" was issued declaring that "absentee property" (defined as "property whose legal owner, or whoever is granted the power to control it by law, left the area prior to June 7, 1967 or subsequently") was forfeited to the Israeli government; in the first few years of the new order, 7.5% of the land in the occupied West Bank would be taken as absentee property.
- In a referendum on the future status of Puerto Rico, voters overwhelmingly endorsed maintaining the island's status as a self-governing Commonwealth in association with the United States. The final result was 425,132 (60.41%) in favor of continuing the commonwealth, with 274,312 in favor of becoming the 51st state, and only 4,248 wanting to be an independent nation.
- Born: Philip Seymour Hoffman, American stage, TV and film actor and 2006 Academy Award winner for his performance as Truman Capote in the film Capote; in Fairport, New York (died of a drug overdose, 2014)

== July 24, 1967 (Monday) ==
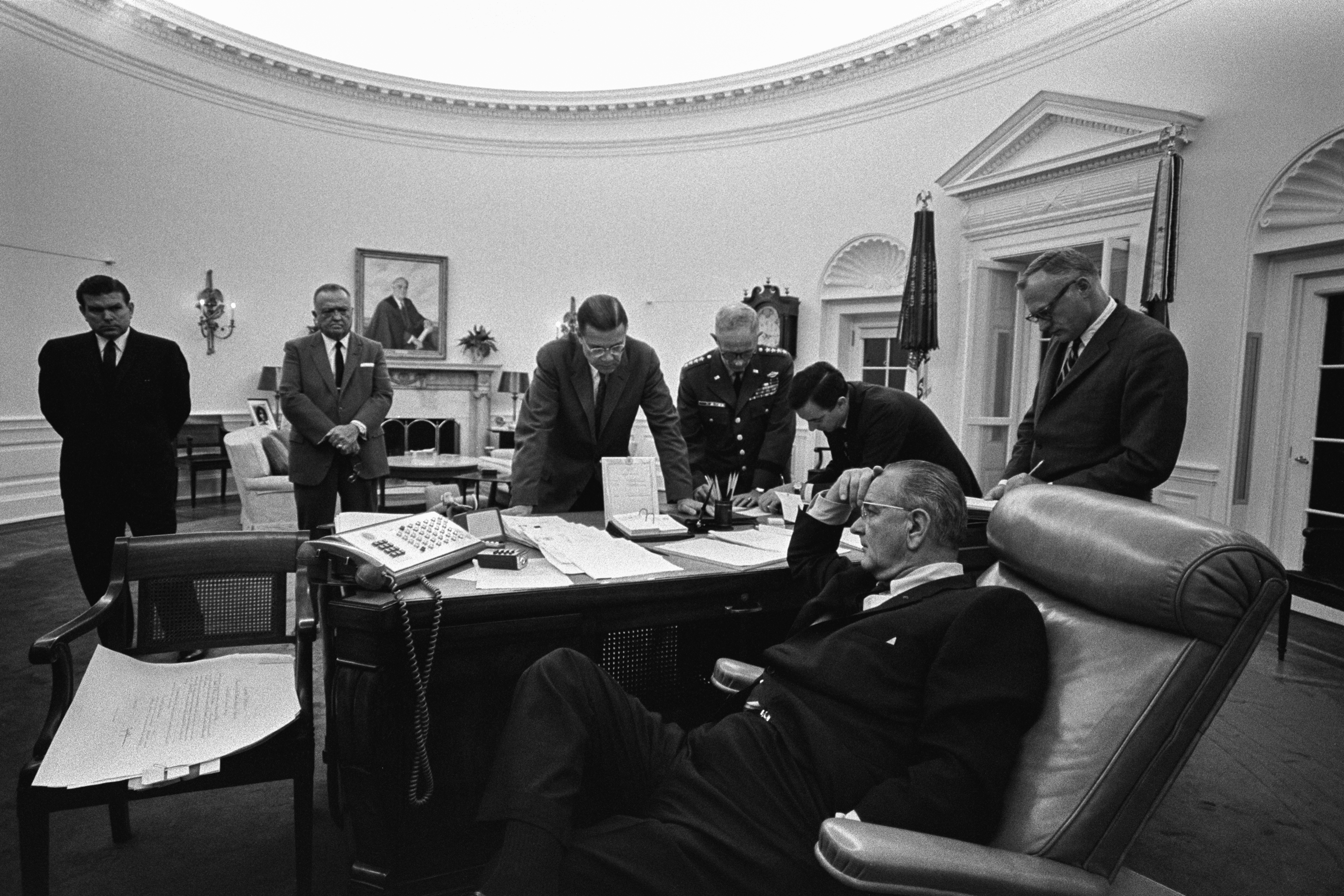
July 24, 1967: Meeting on Detroit riots in Oval Office

- As the death toll in the Detroit riots rose to 18 in their first full day, U.S. President Johnson dispatched 4,700 U.S. Army paratroopers to assist police and the Michigan National Guard. The members of the 82nd Airborne Division from Fort Bragg, North Carolina, and the 101st Airborne Division from Fort Campbell, Kentucky were transported in 137 C-130 transport planes to the Selfridge Air Force Base about 35 miles from downtown Detroit.
- During an official state visit to Canada, French President Charles de Gaulle spoke to a crowd of over 10,000 French-speaking Canadians in Montreal at one of his stops on the way to Ottawa. Reportedly, the crowd sang along when a band played the French national anthem, La Marseillaise, but booed when the same band began to play the Canadian national anthem, O Canada. From the Montreal City Hall, De Gaulle shouted "Vive le Quebec! Vive le Canada Française!" and finished with the separatist slogan "Vive le Québec libre!".
- For the first time, tourists were allowed to travel to the top of the 630-foot high Gateway Arch in St. Louis, as a train inside the Arch was inaugurated.

== July 25, 1967 (Tuesday) ==
- After a six-hour series of emergency meetings with his cabinet, Canada's Prime Minister Lester B. Pearson issued a public rebuke to visiting French President Charles De Gaulle for his speech in Montreal proclaiming "Vive le Quebec libre!" "Certain statements by the president tend to encourage the small minority of our population whose aim is to destroy Canada", Pearson said in summing up the outrage in most of Canada, "and as such they are unacceptable to the Canadian people and its government. The people of Canada are free. Every province of Canada is free. Canadians do not need to be liberated. Indeed, many thousands of Canadians gave their lives in two world wars in the liberation of France and other European countries. Canada will remain united and will reject any effort to destroy her unity." Pearson stopped short of asking De Gaulle to leave Canada, but De Gaulle would cancel his planned meeting with the Prime Minister in Ottawa, and would depart Canada about 24 hours later.
- China's Communist Party began a purge of the nation's military leadership, starting with the arrest of General Xiao Hua, the Director of the People's Liberation Army General Political Department. With the removal of General Xiao, 40 of the top officers of the GPD would be arrested, and most of them would die in prison. Over the next two years, more than 80,000 PLA officers would be accused of treason, and 1,169 of them would be executed, or die of starvation or torture, though General Xiao would ultimately be freed and would live until 1985.
- Fifty gold miners near Carletonville, South Africa, were killed and 49 injured as the group was descending a steep spiral staircase for their shift at the Western Deep Level Mining Company. When one miner slipped, a chain reaction followed as the persons below him toppled down the stairs as well. Most of the deaths were to the miners who were at the bottom of the stairs and who were suffocated.
- Pope Paul VI became the first Roman Catholic pontiff in more than 12 centuries to visit the site of Constantinople, as he arrived in modern-day Istanbul to pay a visit upon Patriarch Athenagoras I, the head of the Eastern Orthodox Church. The last Pope to visit Constantinople had been Pope Constantine, who had met with Patriarch Cyrus in the year 710.
- The discovery of a new gemstone, tanzanite, was registered with the Republic of Tanzania by prospector Manuel d'Souza.
- Born: Matt LeBlanc, American TV and film actor, best known for portraying the character Joey Tribbiani on the TV series Friends and its sequel, Joey from 1994 to 2006; in Newton, Massachusetts

== July 26, 1967 (Wednesday) ==
- NASA Administrator James E. Webb testified on the NASA FY 1968 authorization bill before the Senate Committee on Appropriations' Subcommittee on Independent Offices. Asked by Senator Spessard Holland to make a choice between a substantial cut in funding for the Apollo Applications Program and the Voyager program, Webb replied that both were vital to the U.S. space effort. "The Apollo Application is a small investment to expend on something you have already spent $15 billion to get and it seems to me that this is important. On the other hand, the United States, if it retires from the exploration of the planetary field, in my view-,... [will face] the most serious consequences because the Russians are going to be moving out there and our knowledge of the forces that exist in the Solar System can affect the Earth and can be used for many purposes to serve mankind or for military power...." Criticized by Sen. Holland for refusing to make a choice, Webb said he did not want "to give aid and comfort to anyone to cut out a program. I think it is essential that we do them both."
- The Cunard Line steamship company announced that it had sold its famous ocean liner, RMS Queen Mary, to the highest bidder, the Harbor Commission of Long Beach, California, for $3,444,000. A spokesman for the Harbor Commission said that "The city of Long Beach proposes to transform the ship into one of the world's outstanding tourist attractions" and would convert the ship into a museum and, eventually, into a luxury hotel.
- After being criticized in both Canada and France for his pro-independence speech in Quebec, French President Charles de Gaulle abruptly canceled the remainder of his state visit to Canada and flew back to Paris without going to Ottawa or meeting with Canada's Prime Minister Pearson. De Gaulle had been scheduled to meet with Pearson on July 28, but then boarded his plane at Montreal and went home.
- Born:
  - Tim Schafer, American video game designer, in Pomona, California
  - Jason Statham, English film actor; in Shirebrook, Derbyshire

== July 27, 1967 (Thursday) ==
- The Sexual Offences Act 1967 took effect in the United Kingdom upon receiving royal assent, and legalized homosexual sex in England and Wales between men over the age of 21.
- Oil was exported from the Sultanate of Oman for the first time, three years after it had been discovered.

== July 28, 1967 (Friday) ==
- An uncrewed, 815-foot (248 m) tall balloon was sent up from the White Sands Missile Range in New Mexico, as a part of a project of the Cambridge Research Laboratories to test the use of a special parachute in an "atmosphere similar to that of Mars". The balloon climbed to 129,000 feet (39,000 m) before being brought back down.
- At a design meeting in Huntsville, designers decided to incorporate the Orbital Workshop's two floors into one common grated floor in the crew quarters to save weight. This concept called for the crew quarters to be on one side of the floor and a large open area on the opposite side permitting intravehicular activity in the hydrogen tank dome.
- In the wake of deadly rioting in Newark and Detroit, President Johnson ordered the formation of the 11-member National Advisory Commission on Civil Disorders, more commonly known as the Kerner Commission and chaired by Illinois Governor Otto Kerner Jr. The President's action was made by Executive Order 11365.
- British Steel Corporation was formally created, four months after the Iron and Steel Act 1967 had been given royal assent on March 22. Over the next ten months, the British government would nationalize 14 private British steel manufacturers and almost 200 of their subsidiaries.
- California Governor Ronald Reagan signed the Mulford Act into law as one of the stricter means of gun control, providing a five-year jail term for any person caught carrying a loaded gun on a public street within the state.

== July 29, 1967 (Saturday) ==
- An explosion and fire on the aircraft carrier USS Forrestal killed 134 U.S. Navy sailors and officers while the flight deck crew was fueling and arming aircraft for its second strike of the day against targets in North Vietnam. At 10:47 that morning, a Zuni rocket on an F-4 Phantom jet fighter was "accidentally triggered by a stray surge of electricity" and launched, traveling across the deck and striking an A-4 Skyhawk attack jet and setting it on fire. The carrier's firefighting crew was working on putting out the fire when, two minutes later, the heat caused the bomb on another plane to detonate. Eight more bombs exploded, putting holes in the flight deck and sending burning jet fuel into the lower decks. The disaster would have been worse had it not been for other crewmen who used forklifts to push hundreds of tons of bombs, and several other planes, over the side of the Forrestal. Future Arizona U.S. Senator and presidential candidate John McCain was in the A-4 when it was struck by the rocket, and although he was struck by shrapnel, he had already been suited up in a flameproof jump suit and was able to help in the rescue efforts.
- Former U.S. Vice President Richard M. Nixon spoke to the powerful Republican members of the Bohemian Grove men's club in Monte Rio, California, and delivered what he would later call "the first milestone on my road to the presidency." Without notes, Nixon impressed his audience with his knowledge of foreign policy, introducing the subject with "A quick trip around the world will show how different the problems are today", then talking about the changes in the last 20 years in Western Europe, the Communist nations, Latin America, Africa, and the non-Communist Asian nations.
- A 6.5 magnitude earthquake near Caracas killed 240 people in Venezuela, striking at almost exactly 8:00 in the evening. The quake came four days after Caracas had celebrated the 400th anniversary of its founding on July 25, 1567.
- Died: Lieutenant General Chukwuma Nzeogwu, 30, Nigerian Army officer who had led a failed coup attempt in 1966 and later fought on the side of Biafra during its secession from Nigeria, was killed in battle.

== July 30, 1967 (Sunday) ==
- Former French Prime Minister Georges Bidault moved to Belgium, where he received political asylum after four years of exile in Brazil. Bidault had left France amid accusations that he was supporting a right-wing group that opposed the independence of Algeria from France, and an arrest warrant had been issued later in 1962 when he refused to return home in response to a summons.
- Rioting began in Milwaukee and would lead to a shutdown of city services for 10 days. The violence was brought under control within three days.
- Born: A. W. Yrjänä, Finland rock bass guitarist and poet; as Aki Ville Yrjänä in Kemi
- Died: Alfried Krupp von Bohlen und Halbach, 59, German industrialist, multimillionaire and convicted Nazi war criminal

== July 31, 1967 (Monday) ==
- Mick Jagger and Keith Richards of The Rolling Stones had their jail sentences revised on appeal by a three-member appeals tribunal led by the Lord Chief Justice of England and Wales, Lord Parker. On June 29, Jagger had been sentenced three months imprisonment, and Richards to a year, after being convicted of possession of pep pills and marijuana respectively. "If you keep out of any trouble for the next 12 months", Lord Parker told Jagger, "what has happened will not be on your record as a conviction." Richards was not present, due to illness, but also received a suspended sentence and probation.
- Born:
  - Elizabeth Wurtzel, American author, journalist and lawyer known for her bestseller Prozac Nation; in New York City (died of breast cancer, 2020)
  - Heriberto Seda, American serial killer who was active in New York City from 1990 to 1993; in New York City
  - Minako Honda, Japanese pop music star; in Itabashi, Tokyo (died of leukemia, 2005)
- Died:
  - Margaret Kennedy, 71, English novelist and playwright best known for her 1924 bestselling novel The Constant Nymph
  - Richard Kuhn, 66, Austrian-born German biochemist and 1938 Nobel laureate
