= June 1967 =

Month of 1967

| << | June 1967 | | | | | >> |
| Su | Mo | Tu | We | Th | Fr | Sa |
| | | | | 1 | 2 | 3 |
| 4 | 5 | 6 | 7 | 8 | 9 | 10 |
| 11 | 12 | 13 | 14 | 15 | 16 | 17 |
| 18 | 19 | 20 | 21 | 22 | 23 | 24 |
| 25 | 26 | 27 | 28 | 29 | 30 |

June 10, 1967: The Six-Day War ends with Israel doubling its area within a week by capturing territory from Egypt, Syria, and Jordan

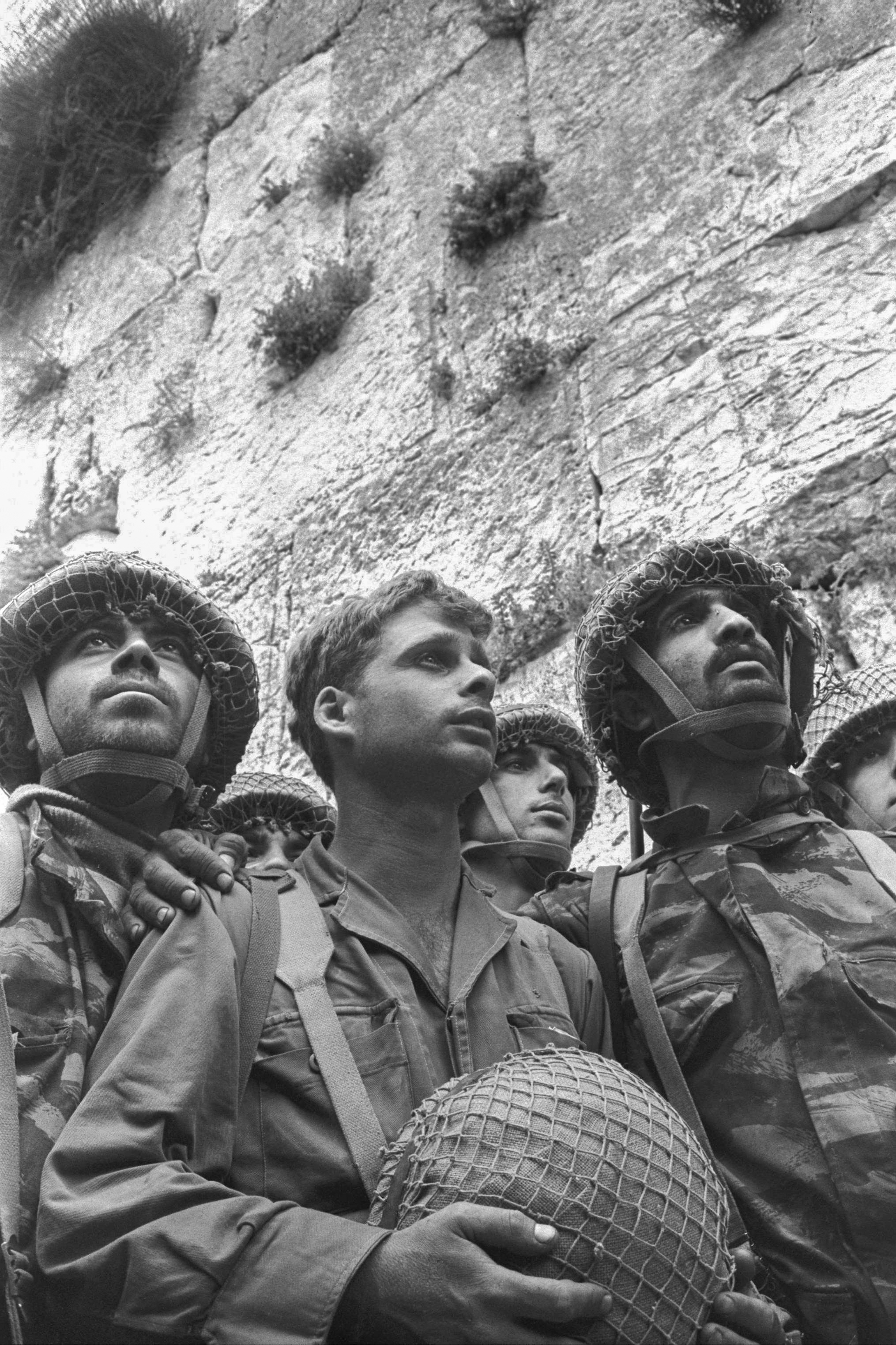
June 7, 1967: Paratroopers at the Western Wall

The following events occurred in June 1967:

== June 1, 1967 (Thursday) ==
- Israel's Prime Minister Levi Eshkol reorganized his cabinet to include his political rivals as part of a "national unity government" in preparation for the expected war with the neighboring Arab nations. Most notably, Eshkol and Foreign Minister Abba Eban brought in Moshe Dayan as the Israeli Defense Minister.
- The McDonald's fast-food chain went international with the opening of its first restaurant in Canada, located at 712 Number Three Road in Richmond, British Columbia, near Vancouver.
- Born: Roger Sanchez, Grammy Award-winning American DJ and remixer; in Queens

== June 2, 1967 (Friday) ==
- During a student protest in West Berlin against the arrival of the Shah of Iran, an unarmed demonstrator, 26-year-old Benno Ohnesorg, was shot at close range and in the back of the head by Karl-Heinz Kurras, a West Berlin police officer. In 2009, German investigators would discover that Kurras had been an operative for East Germany's secret police, the Stasi. Ohnesorg's killing, the indifference of the local press, and the lack of punishment of Kurras by the West German government, would result in the founding of the urban guerrilla group 2 June Movement, with the murder providing "a focus around which the Left could organize and draw larger and larger numbers of young people".
- Luis Jose Monge, prisoner number 35563 at the Colorado State Penitentiary, was executed in the gas chamber at the prison in Canon City, Colorado. On June 28, 1963, Monge had murdered his pregnant wife and three of his children at his home in Denver, then turned himself in to police. Monge would be the last person legally executed in the United States for almost ten years, with the U.S. Supreme Court voiding existing death penalty laws in the 1972 case of Furman v. Georgia and no new executions being done until Gary Gilmore's death by firing squad in 1977.
- American F-105 jets attacked the North Vietnamese port of Cam Pha and cannon fire struck a Soviet diesel ship, the Turkestan, as it sat in harbor. Nikolai Rybachuk, a Soviet merchant sailor, was killed and six others were injured. The United States initially denied that it had struck the Turkestan and attempted to blame the death on North Vietnamese anti-aircraft fire, but conceded 16 days later that the Soviet ship had been strafed by cannon fire from F-105 jets that had participated that day in a third attack on Cam Pha.
- A race riot began in the predominantly African-American Roxbury section of Boston, the first of many riots during the hot summer of 1967. When the rioting in Boston ended after three days, 70 people had been injured, 100 arrested, and millions of dollars of property damage had taken place. Violence in June would follow in Philadelphia (June 10), Tampa (June 11), and Cincinnati (June 13), Dayton, Ohio and Lansing, Michigan (June 15), Atlanta (June 20) and Buffalo (June 26).
- A Goodyear Blimp, one of two that had been stationed at Indianapolis for the 500 mile race earlier in the week, lost gas on its way back to Akron, Ohio, and was tangled in high tension electrical power lines to the east of Dunreith, Indiana.
- An Israeli Defense Forces patrol battled a four-man squad of the Syrian Army, "bringing the first deaths since the onset of the Middle East crisis". One soldier from Syria and two from Israel were killed.
- Born: Nadhim Zahawi, Iraqi Kurdish-British politician; in Baghdad

== June 3, 1967 (Saturday) ==
- All 83 passengers and five crew on board Air Ferry Limited Flight G-APYK, carrying British vacationers to a Mediterranean holiday, were killed when the plane crashed into the side of the Canigou mountain peak in the Pyrenees while circling the resort city of Perpignan for a landing.
- With demolition of the 1964 New York World's Fair site completed and reseeding and reclamation finished by fair organizers, Flushing Meadows Park was turned back over to city officials.
- Born:
  - Tamás Darnyi, Hungarian swimmer and Olympic gold medalist in 1988 and 1992, and World Swimmer of the Year in 1987 and 1991; in Budapest
  - Anderson Cooper, American TV journalist and CNN anchorman; in New York City
- Died: Lord Arthur Tedder, 76, British field marshal and pioneer in bombing techniques during World War II, later Chief of the Air Staff

== June 4, 1967 (Sunday) ==
- Less than 12 hours after the deaths of 83 vacationing British airline passengers on an Air Ferry Limited flight, British Midland Air Lines Flight G-ALHG crashed in Hopes Carr, Stockport, killing 72 passengers and crew. The British Midland plane, a four-engine Argonaut, was bringing holiday travelers back from Majorca and was preparing to land at Manchester when it went down. Another 12 people survived.

== June 5, 1967 (Monday) ==
June 5, 1967: Egyptian aircraft destroyed on the ground

- The Six-Day War began as Israel launched a surprise preemptive strike on Egypt shortly after dawn. At 7:10, sixteen Magister Fouga jet trainers began a routine patrol. Four minutes later, the first of 183 Israeli Air Force fighter planes took off from all over Israel, and by 7:30, all but twelve of Israel's 212 fighters were airborne. The armada of jets flew westward over the Mediterranean Sea for 18 minutes, and at 7:48, they turned south for an attack on Egypt. A radar operator in Jordan radioed Egypt with the word Inab ("grape" in Arabic), the code word for an imminent enemy attack, but Egyptian intelligence had changed the code the day before without notice. Attacks began simultaneously at ten Egyptian bases, then on 14 others, and 189 of the Egyptian Air Force's airplanes, more than half of its fleet, were destroyed on the ground. Most of the others were unable to take to the air because of the destruction of the airfields. Without air support, the Egyptian Army in the Sinai was quickly overwhelmed by Israeli bombing. The allied armies of Egypt, Syria, Iraq and Jordan invaded Israel in retaliation. The Battle of Ammunition Hill became the start of Jordan's ill-fated campaign.
- After the arrest of 11 leaders of the Alianza Federal de Mercedes in Rio Arriba County, New Mexico, armed members of the Mexican-American rights organization arrived at the county seat, Tierra Amarilla, and attempted a citizen's arrest of the county district attorney. Two police officers were wounded, and two others were taken hostage by the fleeing invaders. In response, members of the New Mexico State Police and the New Mexico National Guard raided a picnic of Alianza members and their families at Canjilon, New Mexico, and kept the men, women and children on the grounds for 24 hours despite the lack of any indication that they were connected to the courthouse shooting. In 1970, the U.S. Commission on Civil Rights would prosecute Sanchez and other members of law enforcement for illegal arrests and for repressing the right of free assembly.
- The Moscow–Washington hotline between the President of the United States and the General Secretary of the Communist Party of the Soviet Union was used in crisis for the first time since its inauguration on August 30, 1963. White House Press Secretary George Christian disclosed three days later that the first message sent over the teletype between the Kremlin and the White House had been a message from Soviet Premier Alexei Kosygin to U.S. President Lyndon Johnson, with Johnson responding later in the day. Christian told reporters later that exchanges between the two leaders had taken place throughout the war. Kosygin's initial message, which reached the U.S. Department of Defense at 7:15 a.m in Washington (3:15 p.m. in Moscow) was a request that the U.S. exert its influence on Israel to call a cease-fire.
- As late as 12:30 p.m., five hours after the war began, Israel sent a proposal to Jordan's King Hussein by way of the UN Truce Supervisor, General Odd Bull, giving Jordan one final chance to avoid becoming involved in the war. Israeli Foreign Minister Abba Eban would tell the United Nations two weeks later, "Jordan tragically answered not with words but with a torrent of shells... Surely this responsibility cannot fail to have its consequences in a peace settlement."
- Murderer Richard Speck was sentenced to death in the electric chair for killing eight student nurses in Chicago, with a scheduled execution date of September 1, 1967. The death penalty would be declared unconstitutional in 1972 before the sentence could be carried out, and Speck would spend the remainder of his life in prison.
- Born:
  - Ron Livingston, American actor best known for playing Peter Gibbons in the 1999 film Office Space and Captain Lewis Nixon III in the 2001 miniseries Band of Brothers; in Cedar Rapids, Iowa
  - Joe DeLoach, American sprinter and 200m Olympic gold medalist in 1988; in Bay City, Texas
- Died:
  - Paul Schutzer, 37, American photographer for Life magazine, was killed in a battle in the Negev desert while traveling with the Israeli Army to cover the war. Another American newsman, NBC producer Ted Yates, was fatally wounded the same day while accompanying the Israeli invasion of East Jerusalem and died the next day. Ben Oyserman, an Israeli photographer on assignment for the Canadian Broadcasting Company, was killed the next day when he accidentally tripped a booby trap.
  - Arthur Biram, 88, German-born Israeli educator who founded the first Jewish high school in Ottoman Palestine in 1913; of natural causes during the first day of the Six-Day War

== June 6, 1967 (Tuesday) ==
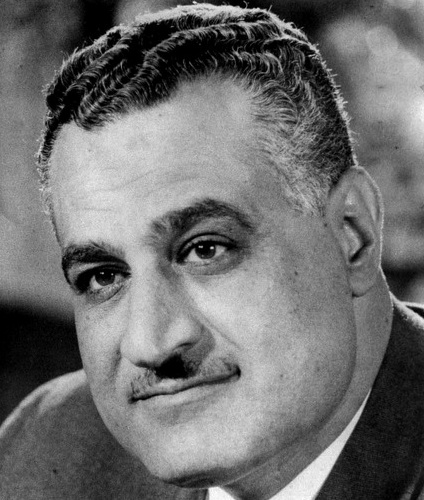
Nasser

- Egypt's President Gamal Abdel Nasser narrowly missed being killed after ordering a plane to fly him over the battlefront in the Sinai. When Nasser's advisers were unable to persuade him not to risk his life, they arranged for him to make the inspection in an unmarked small plane in hopes that the "lumbering, flimsy craft, more for Sunday joy riding than battlefield inspection, would fly too slow and too low to be nailed by the near-supersonic Israeli jets". Twenty minutes after it crossed the Suez Canal at Ismailia, the plane found itself over a procession of Israeli tanks at an altitude of only 50 feet (15 m). An Israeli fighter pilot, unaware that the enemy's president was on the plane, dived at it twice in a strafing run but was unable to shoot it down. Nasser then had the pilot fly north to inspect Bir Hassana and, seeing the ruins of Egypt's armored division, ordered the pilot to return to Cairo.
- United Nations Security Council Resolution 233 was unanimously adopted without debate, expressing concern "at the outbreak of fighting and with the menacing situation in the Near East", and calling upon the participants in the Six-Day War "to take forthwith as a first step all measures for an immediate cease-fire and for a cessation of all military activities in the area", but did not demand that either side withdraw from captured territory. The next day, Resolution 234 was adopted, clarifying that the UN was asking all parties to discontinue fighting by 2000 hours UTC (midnight in Egypt, 11:00 p.m. in Israel, Jordan and Syria). Starting with Jordan, the Arab nations began accepting Resolution 233 and would halt fighting with Israel by the end of the week.
- George E. Mueller, NASA's Associate Administrator for Manned Space Flight, spoke to the American Institute of Aeronautics and Astronautics and described innovations in the Apollo Applications Program (AAP) to reduce the cost of future space missions. Among these were (1) reuse of command modules; (2) landing spacecraft on the ground rather than at sea for further reuse; (3) Using the S-IVB as both a propulsive stage and an orbital workshop (OWS); (4) use of the OWS for several missions; (5) longer flights of up to a year's duration; and reuse of existing Apollo program materials and labor. Mueller said that the AAP's innovations "can lead to benefits of enormous significance to all mankind."
- The eleven oil-exporting Arab nations announced a halt of shipments to the United States and the United Kingdom, with Iraq and Kuwait halting oil exports, Lebanon banning the loading at its ports of oil from Saudi Arabian or Iraqi oil, and Algeria placing six American oil companies there under state control.
- Egypt announced the closure of the Suez Canal to all ships in retaliation for American and British support to Israel during the Six-Day War. It would not reopen until 1975.
- East Jerusalem was captured in a battle conducted by Israeli forces without the use of artillery, in order to avoid damage to the Holy City.
- Born: Paul Giamatti, American film actor and Academy Award winner; in New Haven, Connecticut
- Died: USAF Major Edward G. Givens Jr., 37, American astronaut who had been selected for the Apollo program, was killed in an auto accident near Pearland, Texas, when he lost control of his car. Givens would be replaced by William R. Pogue, who would later orbit the Earth in the Skylab 4 space station mission.

== June 7, 1967 (Wednesday) ==
- "The Israeli Defense Forces have liberated Jerusalem," Defense Minister Moshe Dayan announced to the nation. "We have reunited the torn city, the capital of Israel. We have returned to this most sacred shrine, never to part from it again." For the first time since 1948, the Wailing Wall in Jerusalem was open to Jewish worshipers. Chief Rabbi Solomon Goren joined 150 Israeli paratroopers who had recaptured the eastern half of the city from Jordan. Five minutes after the Israeli Army broke open the brass-covered doors of the Damascus Gate at the walls outside the Dome of the Rock, the Jordanian governor of the city surrendered and promised that the 25,000 residents inside the walls would offer no resistance. Over the next few weeks, "approximately 160 Arab houses facing the Wailing Wall were demolished... to make way for a large prayer area."
- At noon, Israel and Jordan agreed to a cease-fire called for by the United Nations Security Council. Israel's Foreign Minister Abba Eban informed the Secretary-General of the agreement 45 minutes later. A few hours before the cease-fire had gone into effect, Israeli jets attacked King Hussein's personal residence in an apparent attempt to assassinate him. Two days earlier, when the war started, Israel followed up its raid on the Amman airport with an attack on the Basman Palace and struck the former location of his office.
- Israeli photojournalist David Rubinger took the iconic photograph Paratroopers at the Western Wall, depicting Israeli soldiers Zion Karasenti, Yitzhak Yifat and Haim Oshri.
- Born:
  - Dave Navarro, American musician, TV Host and actor; in Santa Monica, California
  - Olli Mustonen, Finland-born classical music composer and pianist; in Vantaa

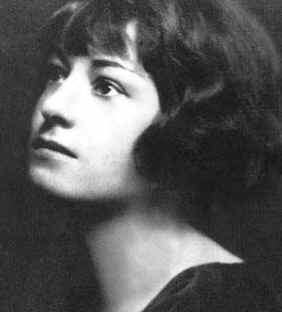
Parker

- Died: Dorothy Parker, 73, American satirist and literary critic; in her room at the residential Volney Hotel at 23 East 74th Street in New York City.

== June 8, 1967 (Thursday) ==
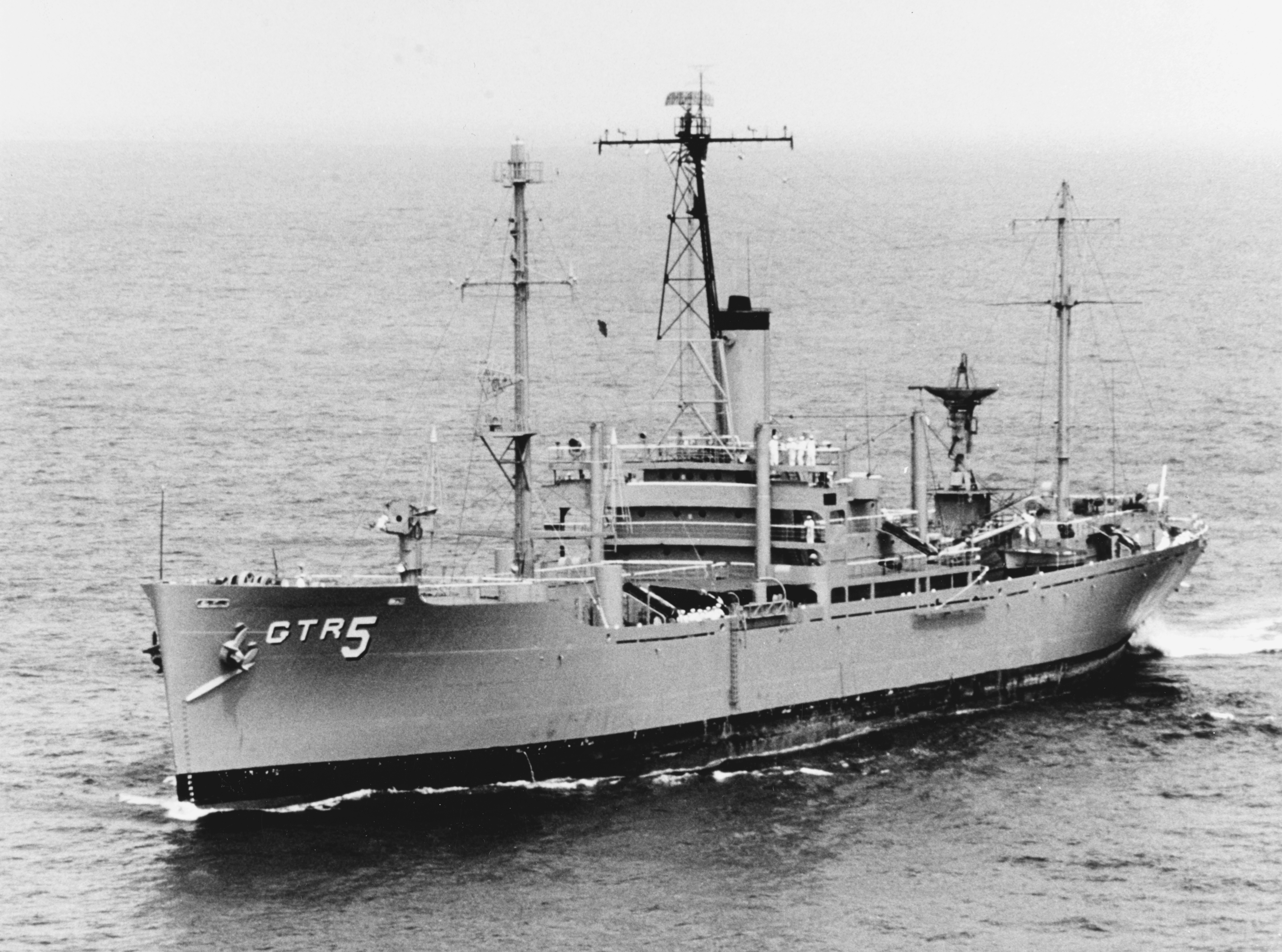
USS Liberty

- Thirty-four U.S. Navy sailors aboard the spy ship USS Liberty were killed, and 171 wounded, when the vessel was strafed by Israeli jet fighters and then torpedoed by Israeli gunboats while in international waters in the Mediterranean Sea about 15 miles from the Sinai Peninsula. The air attack by Mirage jets began at 1210 UTC (2:10 p.m. local time) and the ship was torpedoed 25 minutes later. Eight American attack planes from the aircraft carriers USS America and USS Saratoga were en route to engage the Israelis in combat when the word came from Israel that the attack on the Liberty had been made by mistake.
- The Ras Sedr massacre, a mass murder of 52 Egyptian prisoners of war, took place later in the day, immediately after a paratrooper unit of the Israel Defense Forces conquered Ras Sedr.
- Two Soviet warships "darted in and out" of a group of American warships that were part of the Sixth Fleet task group on training maneuvers in the Mediterranean, south of the Greek island of Crete. A Soviet patrol craft sailed between the U.S. Navy destroyers USS Sampson and USS Byrd to come within 800 yards of the USS America as it was launching jets, while Soviet destroyer No. 626 cut in the path of the America. On the same day, the Soviet Union commenced an operation to intervene on behalf of Syria, with plans to drop paratroopers "between and advancing Israeli army and Damascus" but the plan became moot two days later with the loss of the Golan Heights and Syria's acceptance of the UN cease-fire.
- Chicago Police Superintendent O. W. Wilson issued an order, effective July 10, directing that all members of the Chicago Police Department would wear hats with checkered bands. The distinctive look, still in effect half a century later, was implemented to end the practice by other groups that wore uniforms that closely resembled those of the city police as a means of extorting prostitutes and other offenders. A separate city ordinance made it illegal for any group to duplicate the checkered hat band.
- Elections were held in South Korea for the 175 seats of the National Assembly. Despite winning a little more than half of the valid votes (5,494,922 out of 10,857,008), the ruling Democratic Republican Party of President Park Chung-hee won almost 74% of the seats (129 out of 175).
- The United Arab Republic (Egypt) agreed to the United Nations resolution calling for a cease-fire with Israel, shortly after Israeli forces defeated the remaining Egyptian soldiers fighting in the Sinai peninsula and blocked their escape routes back across the Suez Canal.
- Born:
  - Efan Ekoku, English-born Nigerian footballer; in Cheetham Hill, Manchester
  - Jasmin Tabatabai, Iranian-born German actress and singer; in Tehran
  - Ian Boothby, Canadian-born writer and comedian; in Montreal

== June 9, 1967 (Friday) ==
- Gamal Abdel Nasser announced that he was resigning as President of Egypt, in an address broadcast on nationwide radio and television, and said that he was turning over the presidential duties to one of his vice presidents, Zakaria Mohieddin. After he finished his broadcast, tens of thousands of supporters marched to his residence and urged him to reconsider. Another statement followed on Cairo radio that evening, credited to Nasser, saying "The feelings shown by the masses of the people since my broadcast this evening on the development of the situation have profoundly touched me," and that he would discuss the matter with the National Assembly the next day. When the legislators told him that they would not accept it, Nasser withdrew his resignation.
- Ann Pellegreno and a crew of three people (co-pilot William Payne, navigator William Polhemus, and mechanic Leo Koepke) set out from Oakland to fly around the world in an airplane, following the flight plan that Amelia Earhart and Fred Noonan had used on their ill-fated flight in 1937. Earhart had piloted a Lockheed Model 10-E Electra and Pellegreno used a similar plane, Koepke's Model 10-A Electra. The Earhart Commemorative Flight would be a success, returning to Oakland on July 7 after flying 28,000 miles in 28 days.
- Israel took control of the Golan Heights from Syria by 6:30 in the evening, after routing the Syrians who had been firing mortar shells from the high ground.
- Born:
  - Jian Ghomeshi, Iranian-Canadian radio personality; in London, England
  - Ruben Maza, Venezuelan long-distance runner; in Caracas

== June 10, 1967 (Saturday) ==
- The Six-Day War ended five days after it started, as Syria and Israel agreed to a United Nations-mediated cease-fire at 6:00 in the evening. Having taken the Golan Heights, Israel seized the Syrian town of Kuneitra and was in a position to take the capital, Damascus, 40 miles (64 km) away. During the war, Israel's losses were 777 dead and 2,586 wounded; Egypt, Syria and Jordan had suffered 15,000 deaths and lost hundreds of tanks and airplanes, along with the Sinai Peninsula, the Golan Heights, and the West Bank, respectively.
- The U.S. Department of the Interior declared what Assistant Secretary Cordell Moore referred to as "a petroleum emergency". Moore, who issued the declaration, sent telegrams to 21 American oil companies advising him of the action and called on them to meet in Washington on June 13 to begin work on plans to avoid disruption. At the time, the United States imported less than five percent of its oil from Arab nations.
- Thousands of Israelis spent the Jewish Sabbath crossing into places in Jerusalem that had been closed to them for nearly 20 years until being captured from Jordan a few days earlier. They encountered no hostilities, finding that "Arabs in the old city were cautiously friendly with the swarms of Israeli tourists."
- The Soviet Union severed diplomatic relations with Israel with the delivery of a diplomatic note to the Israeli ambassador in Moscow, declaring that it was acting "in light of Israel's continued aggression against the Arab states and its flagrant violation of the decisions of the Security Council".
- Princess Margrethe, heir apparent to the throne of Denmark, married French count Henri de Laborde de Monpezat.
- Abdirashid Ali Shermarke took office as President of Somalia, and fired Prime Minister Abdirizak Haji Hussein.
- Born: Elizabeth Wettlaufer, Canadian nurse and serial killer who murdered eight senior citizens and injured six others while working at a nursing home in Woodstock, Ontario; as Elizabeth Mae Parker in Zorra, Ontario
- Died:
  - Joseph Ritter, 74, Roman Catholic Archdiocese of St. Louis cardinal and Archbishop of St. Louis since 1946
  - Spencer Tracy, 67, American film actor

== June 11, 1967 (Sunday) ==
- A race riot started in Tampa, Florida after a white patrolman shot and killed a fleeing black youth, 19-year old Martin Chambers. The police said that Chambers and two other people had robbed Tampa Photo Supply, a camera store. An angry mob then set fire to white-owned stores on Central Avenue between Cass Street and Scott Street, burning down an entire city block. The unrest would be calmed down within three days by the recruiting of young African-Americans to a newly created "Youth Patrol".
- Earlier in the day, the Tampa Suncoast Cup Regatta was marred by tragedy when Bill Brow was killed when his hydroplane, the famous Miss Budweiser, flipped during the first race as he was approaching 110 miles per hour (180 km/h).
- Died: Wolfgang Köhler, 80, German psychologist and pioneer in Gestalt psychology

== June 12, 1967 (Monday) ==
- On the final day of its 1966–67 term, the United States Supreme Court issued its decision in Loving v. Virginia, declaring unanimously that Virginia Code §20-59, the criminal prohibition against interracial marriage, was unconstitutional. At that time, Virginia was one of 16 U.S. states that still outlawed miscegenation. "Under our Constitution," Chief Justice Earl Warren wrote, "the freedom to marry, or not marry, a person of another race resides with the individual and cannot be infringed by the State."
- With the close of the term, U.S. Supreme Court Justice Tom C. Clark retired in order to avoid any conflict of interest with cases brought by the United States Department of Justice, headed by his son, U.S. Attorney General Ramsey Clark. According to one historian, "President Johnson actually appointed Ramsey to force his father from the Supreme Court", clearing the way for the nomination of the first African-American U.S. Supreme Court justice.
- The fifth James Bond film, You Only Live Twice, held its world premiere at the Odeon Leicester Square in London, with Queen Elizabeth II attending the premiere. The film opened the following day in the United Kingdom and United States, set an opening day record at the Odeon Leicester Square, and went to number one in the United States with a weekend gross of $600,000.
- Three new currencies were created to replace the Malaya and British Borneo dollar that had been used interchangeably in two independent nations and a British colony. These were replaced by the Malaysian dollar (later referred to as the ringgit), the Singapore dollar and the Brunei dollar.
- Venera 4 was launched toward Venus by the Soviet Union. On October 18, it would become the first space probe to enter another planet's atmosphere and successfully return data.

== June 13, 1967 (Tuesday) ==
- The Washington Senators defeated the Chicago White Sox, 6 to 5, in 22 innings in what was, up to that time, "the longest night game in baseball history", lasting 6 hours and 38 minutes. The game in Washington had started at 7:00 the previous evening.
- U.S. Solicitor General Thurgood Marshall was nominated as the first African American justice of the United States Supreme Court. Marshall would be confirmed on August 30 by a 69 to 11 vote and would be seated on October 2.
- Born: Jeanine Áñez, Bolivian lawyer, politician, and television presenter who served as the 66th president of Bolivia from 2019 to 2020; in San Joaquín, Beni
- Died:
  - RAF Marshal Edward Ellington, 89, British Chief of the Air Staff who increased the number of bomber squadrons prior to World War II during his tenure between 1933 and 1937.
  - Gerald Patterson, 71, Australian tennis player and winner of Wimbledon (1919, 1922) and the Australian Open (1927).

== June 14, 1967 (Wednesday) ==
- Two days after the Soviet launch of Venera 4, the United States launched Mariner 5 toward Venus at 2:01 in the morning from Cape Kennedy. Mariner 5 would reach Venus on October 19, one day after Venera 4 had landed there, and would pass within 4,094 kilometres (2,544 miles) of the planet during its closest approach at 1:34 p.m. Eastern time.
- Air Mauritius was founded as a joint venture of the Mauritian government, BOAC, Air France, and the sales agent Rogers and Company, though it would not fly its own aircraft until September 13, 1972.
- Died: Eddie Eagan, 70, American sportsman who won two gold medals at the Summer Olympics (in 1920 in boxing) and the Winter Olympics (in 1932 in the four-man bobsled).

== June 15, 1967 (Thursday) ==
- Libya's Foreign Minister, Ahmad Bishti summoned the ambassadors from the United States and from the United Kingdom to his office and told them that the Libyan candidate had voted to demand the closure of their bases there, in retaliation for American and British support of Israel during the Six-Day War. The main U.S. facility, Wheelus Air Base, housed 10,000 servicemen of the 17th U.S. Air Force, and their families, and was located five miles from Tripoli. Britain's Royal Air Force maintained a staging post at RAF El Adem.
- The British Phosphate Commission signed an agreement with the government of the UN Trust Territory of Nauru, allowing Nauru to buy back the phosphate for 20 million Australian dollars over a three-year period. After independence, Nauru would finish payment more than a year ahead of schedule, and control would be turned over to Nauru on July 1, 1970.
- Born:
  - Fred Tatasciore, American voice actor; in Los Angeles
  - Yūji Ueda, Japanese voice actor; in Kitakyushu

== June 16, 1967 (Friday) ==
- The three-day Monterey Pop Festival began in Monterey, California, at the Monterey County Fairgrounds. One historian opined that it "ushered in the era of the major music festival and helped launch the careers of several major rock artists." The musicians who performed on the first evening were The Association, Lou Rawls, Johnny Rivers, Eric Burdon & The Animals and Simon & Garfunkel. The non-profit Festival attracted 50,000 paid admissions and a crowd of 125,000 unpaid spectators, and grossed more than half a million dollars.
- A Brazilian Air Force C-47 cargo plane, with 25 people on board, crashed in the Amazon jungle while carrying supplies to a besieged monitoring outpost. There were seven survivors, including an Air Force physician, Dr. Paulo Fernandes. Despite a shattered right leg, Dr. Fernandes located the remaining men and kept all but two of them alive for 11 days until they were located by an aerial search and rescued.
- Six Flags Over Georgia, the second of the Six Flags amusement parks after Six Flags Over Texas, opened outside of Atlanta near the town of Austell, Georgia. Originally, the location was to be called "Georgia Flags Park" because "the fact is that Georgia has not necessarily been under the flags of six separate countries".
- Died: Reginald Denny, 75, English inventor and actor who produced the first mass-produced American target drone, the Radioplane OQ-2, during World War II, and who was a stage, film and television actor, as well as a former amateur boxing champion of England.

== June 17, 1967 (Saturday) ==
- The People's Republic of China successfully exploded its first hydrogen bomb. Only three other nations— the United States, the Soviet Union and the United Kingdom— had successfully tested a fusion bomb. China's achievement with a three megaton device came less than three years after they had first exploded an atomic bomb. As with the five fission bomb tests, the H-bomb was detonated at the Lop Nor dry lake bed in the Xinjiang Autonomous Region. The Chinese government said that its tests and weapons were "entirely of the purpose of defense, with the ultimate aim of abolishing nuclear weapons."
- Israeli Major General Chaim Herzog, the new administrator of territories captured from Jordan, began the process of making Palestinian Arabs leave their residences in the Jewish Quarter of the Old City of Jerusalem, either with eviction proceedings for renters, or payment to Palestinian residents who owned their dwellings. All of the persons made to leave were "asked to sign a document relinquishing their right of return". About 600 buildings in the quarter were expropriated by the Israeli government, and either torn down or renovated for use by Jewish residents.
- Border Patrol Inspectors Theodore L. Newton, Jr. and George F. Azrak of the United States Border Patrol stopped a vehicle containing over 800 pounds (360 kg) of marijuana on Highway 79 near Oak Grove, San Diego County, California. The occupants of the vehicle overpowered the two inspectors and brought them to a cabin near Anza in Riverside County, California, where they were both shot and killed.
- U.S. Defense Secretary Robert S. McNamara commissioned a top secret study titled "History of U.S. Decision Making Process on Vietnam Policy", which would, in 1971, be leaked to the New York Times and published as The Pentagon Papers.

== June 18, 1967 (Sunday) ==
- Thakin Than Tun, the leader of the Communist Party of Burma, carried out his version of China's Cultural Revolution and completed the denunciation and purging of his foes within the party with the execution of party theoretician H. N. Goshal as "Burma's Liu Shaoqi" and Yebaw Htay as "Burma's Deng Xiaoping". Than Tun himself would be killed a year later by a Burmese government agent who had infiltrated the party.
- American rock guitarist Jimi Hendrix made his American debut, appearing on the final day of the Monterey Pop Festival, after finding success in the United Kingdom.
- The Who played their first concert in the United States, appearing at the Monterey Pop Festival.
- Born: Clifton Campbell, American sprinter

== June 19, 1967 (Monday) ==
- Former Israeli Prime Minister David Ben-Gurion suggested that an autonomous Palestinian Arab state be formed by Israel within the recently captured West Bank. Under Ben-Gurion's vision, "the state could be linked in an economic treaty with Israel, have guaranteed access to the Mediterranean Sea, and be protected by Israeli troops". He suggested also that Israel should offer to conclude a treaty that would allow Jordan an outlet on the Mediterranean but added that the recently acquired city of Jerusalem should not be given back to Jordan. "We will never discuss this with any party," he wrote. "Jerusalem has been the capital of Israel since the days of King David, and so it shall remain forever and ever."
- Soviet Union Premier Alexei Kosygin, who was in New York City on his first visit to the United States, turned down an invitation by U.S. President Lyndon Johnson for a meeting at the White House to discuss world issues. Through diplomatic channels, Kosygin passed the word that his visit was solely to attend the special session of the UN General Assembly and not for a summit with the President. On the same day, Kosygin addressed the General Assembly and accused the U.S. of promoting an "incitement campaign against the Arab states and their leaders." Kosygin reconsidered the invitation days later and agreed to meet Johnson in Glassboro, New Jersey.
- In a secret meeting, Israel's cabinet of ministers approved its Resolution 563, approving the eventual return of the captured Sinai Peninsula to Egypt if diplomatic relations could be established and if Egypt recognized Israel's right to exist as a Jewish nation. The same condition of a return to pre-war borders would be offered to Syria, but not to the West Bank or to the Gaza Strip.
- Egypt's Prime Minister Zakaria Mohieddin resigned along with his government at the request of President Nasser, who then formed a ministry on his own.
- Born:
  - Bjørn Dæhlie, Norway cross-country skier, World champion (1991, 1993, 1995, 1997), Olympic gold medalist (1992, 1994, 1998); in Elverum
  - Mia Sara, American film actress (Sloane in Ferris Bueller's Day Off); as Mia Sarapochiello in Brooklyn Heights, New York City

== June 20, 1967 (Tuesday) ==
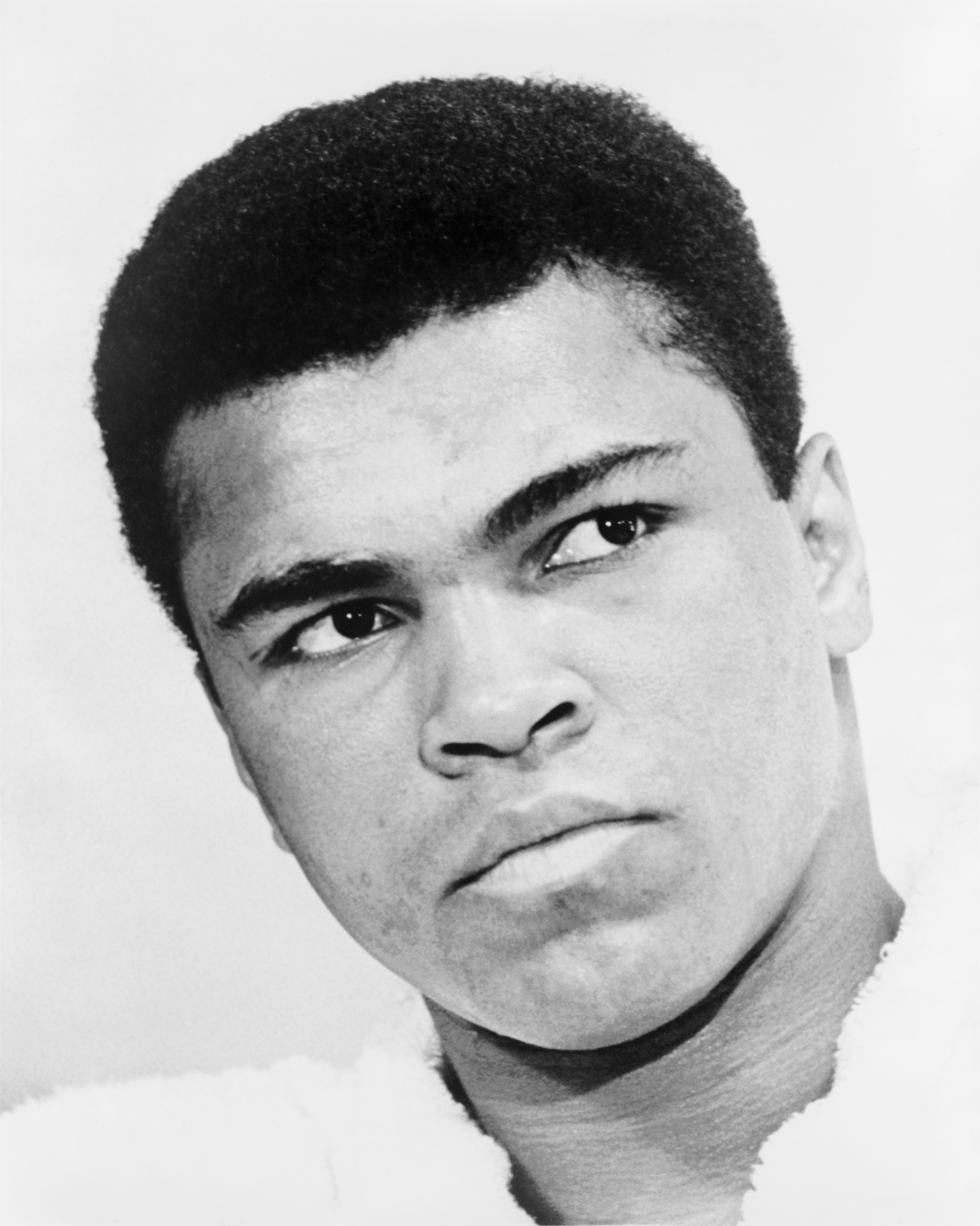
Ali

- Muhammad Ali, recently stripped of his title as world heavyweight boxing champion, was found guilty of draft evasion by a federal jury in Houston after 20 minutes of deliberation. After the verdict, Ali asked for the sentence to be pronounced immediately, and U.S. District Judge Joe Ingraham sentenced him to five years in prison and a $10,000 fine, the maximum penalty for the felony conviction. The next day, Ali's lawyers filed an appeal. Ali remained free on a $5,000 bond pending the outcome of the review of the case. Though barred from boxing professionally, Ali would spend the next three years on the lecture circuit at colleges, and would be an actor on film and even in a Broadway musical (Big Time Buck White) before the United States Supreme Court would reverse the conviction on June 28, 1970.
- The U.S. House of Representatives voted, 385–16, to approve a bill to make the burning of the American flag a federal crime— then discovered that they had passed a bill that had left out the word "burning". Congressman Cornelius E. Gallagher of New Jersey commented, "I suggest perhaps we have a bill-burning." The members left it to the U.S. Senate to correct the wording.
- The American Independent Party, a new political party that was organized to prepare for former Alabama Governor George C. Wallace to run as a third-party candidate for President of the United States, announced its plans to get on the ballot of all 50 states in time for the 1968 U.S. presidential election.
- Seventeen British soldiers, a British civil servant, and two Arab policemen were killed in a mutiny by Yemeni Arab police in Aden. The police were reportedly upset over the recent suspension of four Arab colonels in the police force, and order was restored after the colonels were reinstated.
- Born: Nicole Kidman, Australian-American film actress; in Honolulu

== June 21, 1967 (Wednesday) ==
- Soviet Union head of state Nikolai V. Podgorny arrived for a state visit to Cairo and arranged for the replacement of Egyptian Air Force planes that had been destroyed during the Six Day War. By July 15, the new aircraft would be delivered, thousands of Soviet military advisers arrived in Egypt, and Soviet ships arrived at Egyptian ports at the request of President Nasser. "For a leader who had once struggled to rid Egypt of any foreign military presence," a historian would write later, "the Soviet presence was a humiliating symbol of Egypt's plight." Over three weeks, the Egyptian arsenal was replenished with 93 MiG-17 jet fighters, 71 MiG-21 supersonic fighter-interceptors, 38 Sukhoi aircraft and 100 tanks.
- Ruhi al-Khatib, the Arab mayor of the formerly Jordanian East Jerusalem, raised the flag of Israel over the town hall, in a ceremony attended by Teddy Kollek, the Mayor of Israeli Jerusalem. Mayor Kahtib, who had been a civil servant in British Palestine, shook hands with Mayor Kollek and said, "All of us love Jerusalem. We will do our best for Jerusalem", while Mayor Kollek said "Now we are again citizens of united Jerusalem. We shall both have to adjust ourselves." Only eight days later, the Israeli government dissolved the Palestinian municipal government of East Jerusalem and fired Khatib.
- Although the name "Summer of Love" would later be used to describe an entire social movement during the spring and summer of 1967, the event that originally employed the name began before dawn in front of the Twin Peaks near the center of San Francisco, where the celebration by thousands of American hippies of the summer solstice took place as planned by an underground newspaper, the San Francisco Oracle.
- Born:
  - Yingluck Shinawatra, 28th Prime Minister of Thailand from 2011 to 2014 and businesswoman; in San Kamphaeng District
  - Pierre Omidyar, French-born Iranian-American billionaire who is the founder of eBay; in Paris

== June 22, 1967 (Thursday) ==
- A 23-year-old newcomer to the Australian Army became the second known person to be killed by an octopus; the other victim had been a member of the Royal Australian Navy, in 1954. James Albert Ward had joined the army a day earlier, and was exploring a rock pool near Camp Cove at South Head in Sydney. He and two younger recruits found a blue-ringed octopus and were taking it back to their barracks. Private Ward made the mistake of placing the small creature on his arm, unaware of its highly poisonous venom, and was bitten. According to his companions, Ward had been unaware of the bite until he began feeling dizzy and was unable to breathe, and he died less than 90 minutes later at the Prince Henry Hospital.
- British Home Secretary Roy Jenkins announced in London that the United Kingdom would adopt year-round "summer time", moving clocks forward one hour on February 18, 1968, and keeping them at one hour ahead of Greenwich Mean Time.

== June 23, 1967 (Friday) ==
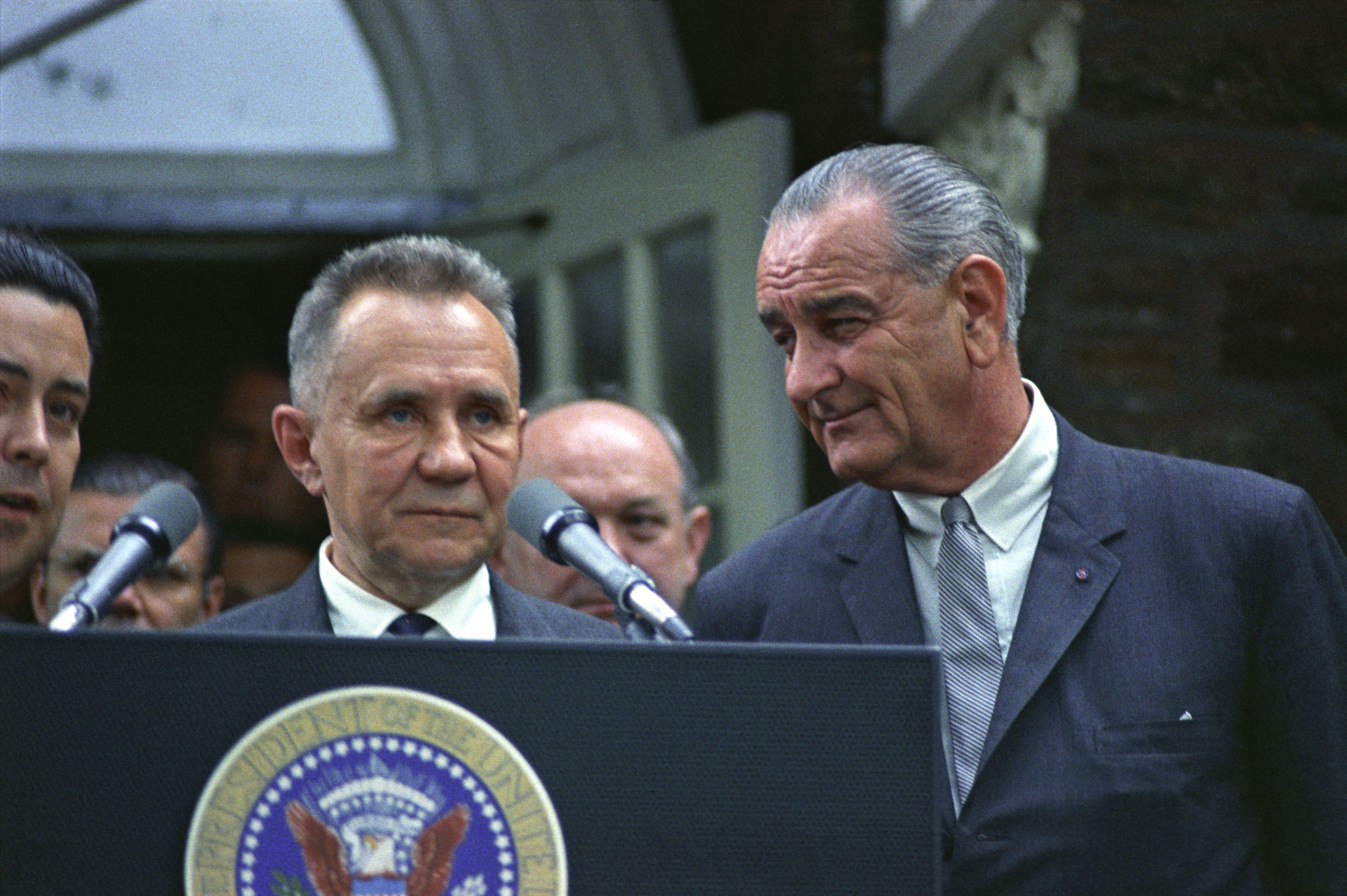
June 23, 1967: Soviet Premier Kosygin and U.S. President Johnson meet in Glassboro

- U.S. President Lyndon B. Johnson met with Soviet Premier Alexei Kosygin in Glassboro, New Jersey, for the 3-day Glassboro Summit Conference. The town of only 10,000 people was chosen because it was approximately midway between New York City and Washington and "mutually convenient" to the leaders' schedules. The meeting was held at 11:00 in the morning on the campus of Glassboro State College at the home of the college's president, Thomas Robinson. Kosygin informed Johnson that there would be no discussions about halting the arms race between the two superpowers until the Vietnam War ended.
- The United States Senate voted, 92 to 5, to censure U.S. Senator Thomas J. Dodd of Connecticut for using more than $116,000 of campaign contributions, for his personal benefit. There was no interruption in his ongoing term. By a 51 to 45 vote, however, the Senate removed a second charge against Dodd accusing him of "double billing", charging the same travel expenses to the Senate and private organizations. Dodd was found to have used more than $116,000 in campaign contributions for his own use. The action against Dodd, a white Senator, contrasted with the punishment meted against black U.S. Representative Adam Clayton Powell Jr. in January, blocking Powell from taking his seat because of his conversion of House funds for personal use. Connecticut's Democratic Party would decline to renominate him for re-election in 1970, and he would lose as an independent candidate to Lowell Weicker.
- Johnson flew to Los Angeles after the summit in Glassboro, and encountered a large protest rally outside the Century Plaza Hotel, where he was addressing a $500-a-person fundraising dinner. At least 10,000 antiwar demonstrators were gathered outside the hotel when members of the Los Angeles Police Department gave two warnings to disperse. The protesters chose to ignore the warnings and the police were forced to deal with the unruly mob. One historian would later note that "Los Angeles became the first city in the country to break up an antiwar march with violence."
- At a track and field meet in Bakersfield, California, two world athletic records were broken on the same day. Paul Wilson cleared the pole vault at 17 feet, 8 inches, breaking the record of 17'7" set by Bob Seagren. Jim Ryun ran one mile in 3 minutes, 51.1 seconds, breaking his previous world record of 3:51.3.
- All 34 people aboard Mohawk Airlines Flight 40 were killed when the tail section of the BAC-111 fanjet broke off in midflight and the plane crashed into a hillside near Blossburg, Pennsylvania. The accident happened shortly after the flight's takeoff from Elmira, New York en route to Washington, D.C.
- Born: Yoko Minamino, Japanese TV actress and singer; in Itami
- Died: Franz Babinger, 76, German historian

== June 24, 1967 (Saturday) ==
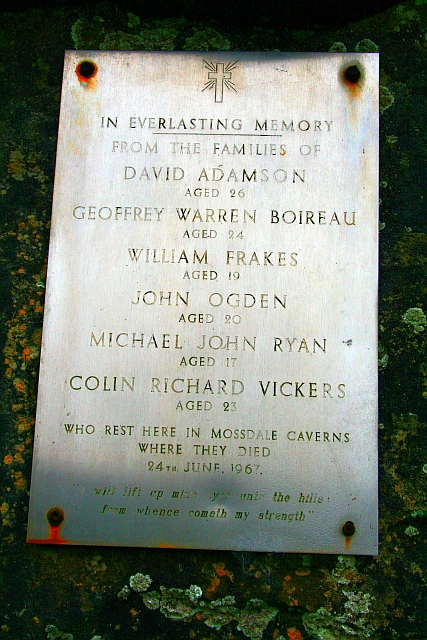
Memorial plaque to the cavers who died in the Mossdale Caverns tragedy

- Tornadoes, rarely seen in Europe, killed at least 22 people and injured 200 as they swept across France, Belgium and the Netherlands. Six villages in the Nord Department of France, near Douai, were struck, killing seven and injuring 40, while six were killed and 17 hurt in the Dutch provinces of North Brabant and Gelderland, with the villages of Chaam, Tricht and Buurmalsen particularly hard hit. In Belgium, the village of Oostmalle was heavily damaged. Heavy rainstorms in northern England led to the deaths of six cave explorers near Conistone, who drowned after a rain-swollen stream flooded their cavern.
- Pope Paul VI formally issued the papal encyclical Sacerdotalis caelibatus, reaffirming the historic rule of clerical celibacy for the Roman Catholic Church clergy and the ban against marriage. Although the Second Vatican Council had declined to address the matter, the Pope issued the decision. Swiss Catholic priest and theologian Hans Küng would comment that the rule was made "without consulting the bishops in any way... with crass disregard of the collegiality which had been ceremonially decided on at the Council." "Priestly celibacy has been guarded by the church for centuries as a brilliant jewel," the Pope wrote in an encyclical, "and retains its value undiminished even in our time when mentality and structures have undergone such profound changes."
- President Joseph Mobutu of the Democratic Republic of the Congo decreed a nationwide monetary reform in response to inflation, replacing the Congolese franc with a new currency, the zaire. Each zaire was worth 1,000 old francs, which had dropped in value by 70%. After more than 25 years more of inflation, the nouveau zaire would be introduced in 1993, worth Ƶ 3,000,000 (or three billion Congolese francs). Five years later, the Congolese franc would be brought back at the rate of NƵ 100,000 (300 billion old zaires or 300 trillion old francs).
- The British nuclear submarine HMS Dreadnought torpedoed the wreckage of the West German tanker Essberger Chemist in order to remove a shipping hazard near the Azores Islands. Despite being struck by three bombs, the tanker failed to sink immediately and had to be finished off by gunfire from the Royal Navy frigate HMS Salisbury. The ship had exploded on June 2, but all 39 crew had been rescued, unharmed, by the Norwegian freighter Tomar and the Greek tugboat Nisos Zakinthos.
- Chuck Norris of Redondo Beach, California, won his first major karate championship in competition at the All-American Open Karate Championship at Madison Square Garden in New York. Norris defeated karate champion Julio LaSalle in the final.
- Born: Janez Lapajne, Slovenian film director; in Celje

== June 25, 1967 (Sunday) ==
- An estimated 400 million viewers around the world watched Our World, the first live, international, satellite television production. The two-hour program was seen in 26 nations on five continents. In the UK, the show began at 8:00 p.m. UTC on BBC-1, and in the United States, it was seen starting at 3:00 p.m. Eastern time, 12 noon Pacific, on the National Educational Television (NET) stations. The Australian Broadcasting Corporation carried the live program in the early morning hours of Monday the 26th, where it began at 5:00 in the morning in Sydney. The telecast opened with the birth of a baby in Mexico City and the debut of The Beatles' song "All You Need Is Love" from London.
- President Johnson and Prime Minister Kosygin had a second meeting in Glassboro, New Jersey, the day after the Soviet Premier had made a visit to Niagara Falls.

== June 26, 1967 (Monday) ==
- Two officers of the Syrian Army, Major Salim Hatoum and Major Badr Jumaa, were executed for treason the day after they were said to have confessed that they had plotted to overthrow the Syrian government on behalf of the American, British and West German intelligence agencies. Major Hatoum, who had fled to Jordan after an unsuccessful coup attempt in September, had returned to fight in the Six-Day War after a general amnesty for political offenders had been announced.
- The White House staff announced in Washington that negotiators for the United States and Panama had reached agreement on a treaty regarding the Panama Canal. Although terms of the treaty were not released, informed sources said that the purpose was for the U.S. to replace the 1903 treaty, share responsibility for the operation and management of the canal with Panama, and give Panama sovereignty over the Panama Canal Zone, at the time a U.S. territory.
- A race riot began in Buffalo, New York and would continue until July 1, during which 200 people would be arrested.
- Born: Luisito Espinosa, Philippine boxer, WBA bantamweight champion (1989–1991) and WBC featherweight champion (1995–1999); in Manila
- Died: Françoise Dorléac, 25, French film actress; in a car accident when she lost control of a rented automobile while driving at high speed to catch a flight from the Nice Côte d'Azur Airport. Her car burst into flames after colliding with a highway sign near Villeneuve-Loubet.

== June 27, 1967 (Tuesday) ==
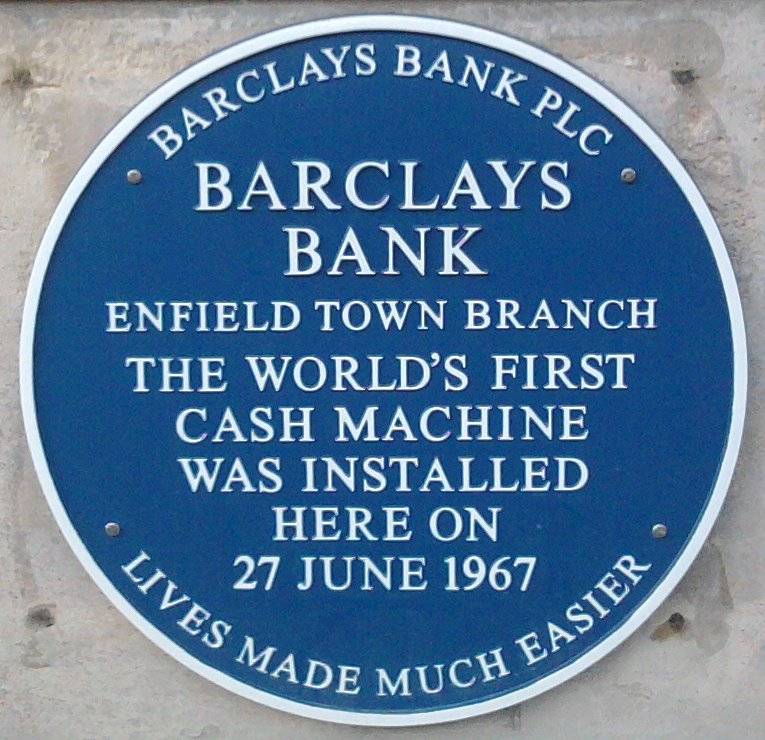
Plaque commemorating installation of world's first bank cash machine

- The first automated teller machine (ATM) or automatic cash machine began service, at a branch of Barclays Bank in Enfield Town in North London. The system used printed "Barclaycash" vouchers that were "issued, free of charge, to pre-approved customers who were also entrusted with a personal code number". The procedure was for a customer to put the voucher in the automatic drawer; when a green light came on, the customer then entered the personal code, the machine checked the account balance, and another drawer would open, containing a £10 note for each voucher. Inventor John Shepherd-Barron of the De La Rue banknote printing company perfected the machine and British television star Reg Varney appeared in the advertising campaign. Shepherd-Barron had originally planned to have the machine respond to a six-digit PIN but "discovered that his wife could not remember more than four digits, thus the worldwide standard for PINs is four digits."
- Fu Ti-kuang, the chargé d'affaires for the People's Republic of China embassy in East Germany, was killed, along with two other Chinese diplomats and the car's driver, in a head-on collision with a truck north of Neustrelitz, causing a rift between the two Communist nations. After Foreign Minister Otto Winzer visited the embassy and said that the Chinese driver had been at fault for driving into oncoming traffic while trying to pass a truck on rainy day, the staff put up posters in German that said "Down with the German revisionists who murdered our comrades!" and a diplomat shouted at passersby "German Nazis, murderers, modern revisionists, German blood must flow to wash away the blood of our murdered comrades!" The crowd was shouting back insults when police dispersed them with a water cannon.
- Carl Wilson, the lead guitarist of The Beach Boys, was acquitted by a federal court judge in Los Angeles of charges of draft evasion. Wilson testified that he was a conscientious objector, the defense that had been rejected earlier in the month for Muhammad Ali.

== June 28, 1967 (Wednesday) ==
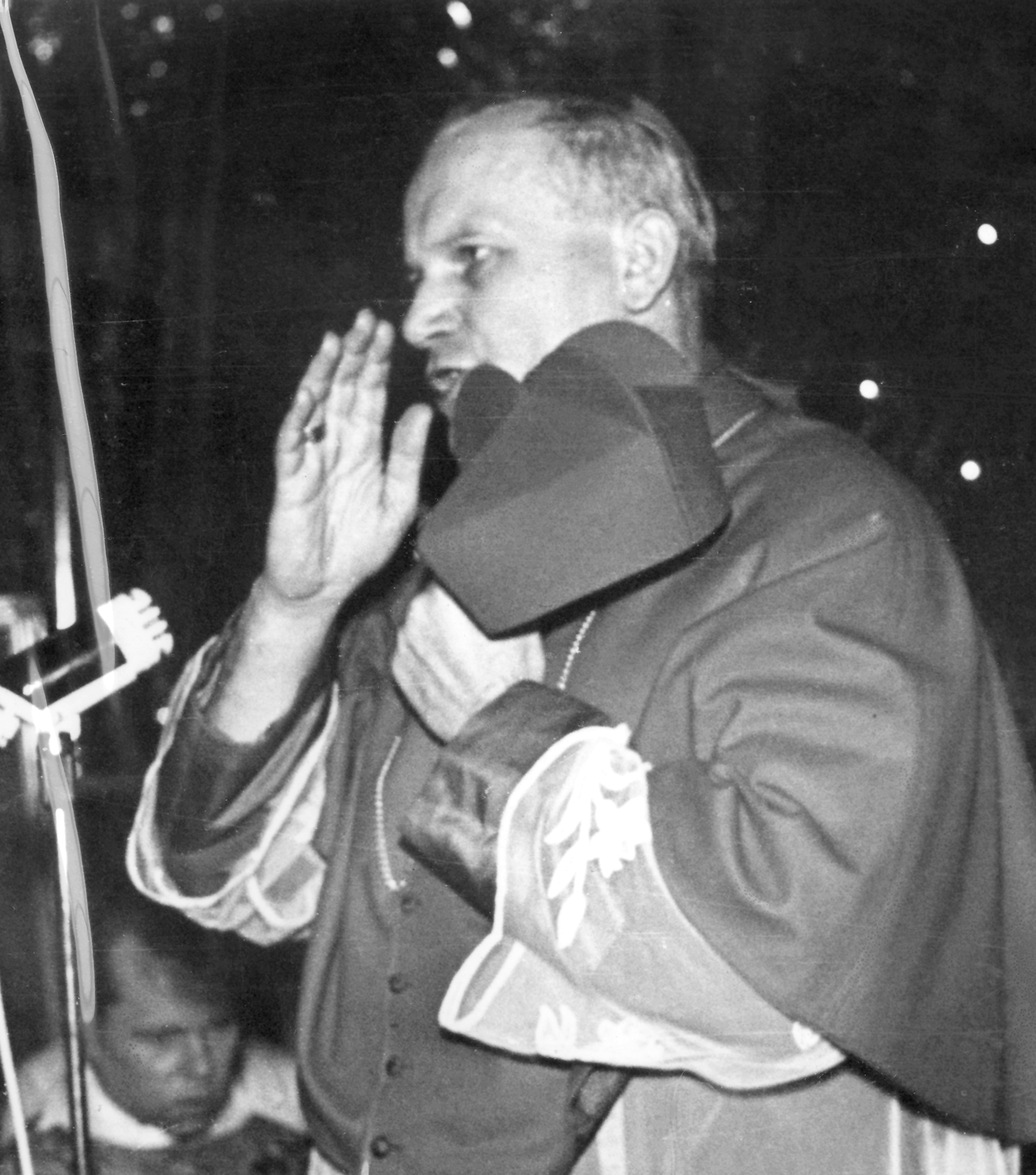
Future Pope Karol Wojtyla

- Pope Paul VI formally ordained 24 new cardinals at a ceremony in the Sistine Chapel in Vatican City, conferring upon each of them a red biretta emblematic of the Roman Catholic church cardinalate. For the first time in church history, the cardinals were required to recite an oath. The newly ordained cardinals included Archbishop Karol Wojtyla, who would, in 1978, become Pope John Paul II, and would later be made a Roman Catholic saint.
- Israel extended its jurisdiction over East Jerusalem and its suburbs, which had been captured earlier in the month from Jordan, the day after the Knesset had approved the right of Israel's municipal government to extend its authority to the old city. Under the legislation, the municipal government that had been led by a Palestinian mayor and city council was dissolved. Jordan had annexed the eastern section of the city on April 24, 1950; Israel would not formally annex the eastern section until June 30, 1980, when the Knesset passed the Jerusalem Law. Another bill provided that safeguards would be set so that people of all religions (Judaism, Islam and Christianity) would have access to the shrines in the Holy City, and a final law provided a penalty of seven years imprisonment for anyone desecrating a shrine.
- Donald K. Slayton and Christopher C. Kraft, Jr. of Manned Spacecraft Center (MSC) recommended launching an uncrewed vehicle first in the first Apollo Applications Program double mission. If the uncrewed vehicle failed to function in orbit, or even to achieve orbit, the CSM would not be launched as planned.
- Hussein Maziq resigned as Prime Minister of Libya after Arab nationalists rioted following Egypt's defeat by Israel. King Idris installed Abdul Qadir al-Badri as a "law and order" leader to suppress the demonstrators and to end a strike by oil workers.
- At the same time, the Bank of Israel announced that the Israeli pound would be the only legal currency in the unified Jerusalem and set an exchange rate of 7 1/2 Jordanian dinars for the pound for three days.

== June 29, 1967 (Thursday) ==
- The "Green Line" that had marked the boundary between Israeli Jerusalem and Jordanian Jerusalem, was dismantled by order of Defense Minister Moshe Dayan. Over a period of days, 16 kilometres (9.9 miles) of barbed wire, along with "several concrete ramparts, fifty-five fortified guard stations, and hundreds of mines in the buffer zone" were removed and, "True to his military objective and his public promise to extend 'the hand of peace' to Israel's Arab neighbors, Dayan ushered in a period of relative peace and cooperation in Jerusalem that lasted until the start of the first intifada in 1987."
- The U.S. Department of the Post Office announced a new service where, for one dollar, one could locate the last recorded change of address of a person who had moved away, under the Freedom of Information Act.
- The Chamber of Deputies of Luxembourg abolished compulsory military service and created a small "battalion-size" army of volunteers who served 3-year enlistments.
- Born: Jeff Burton, American NASCAR driver; in South Boston, Virginia

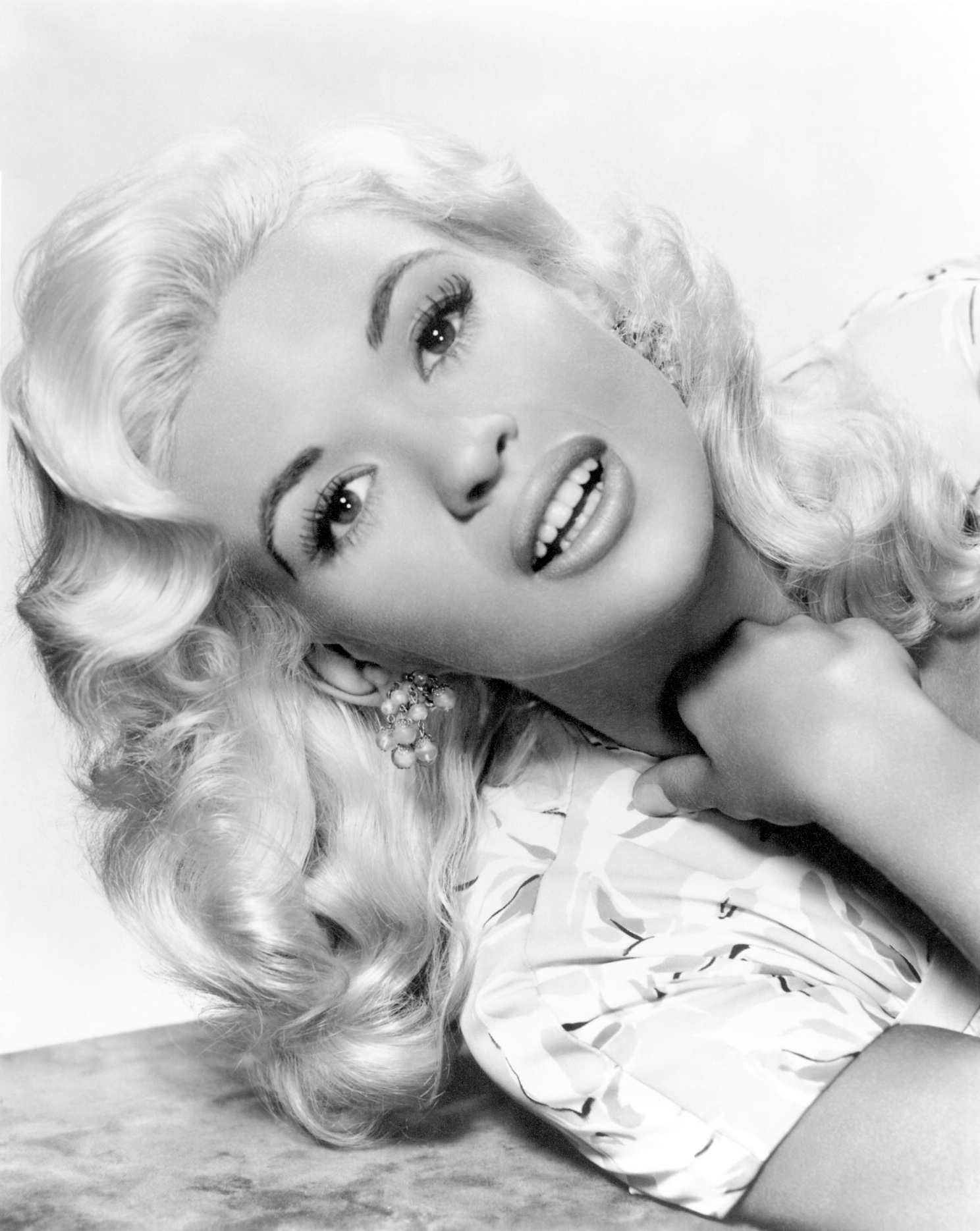
Mansfield

- Died:
  - Jayne Mansfield, 34, American film and stage actress, was killed along with her friend, Sam Brody, and Ronnie Harrison, the driver of the car in which she was riding. At about 1:00 in the morning, Mansfield's car came around a narrow curve on U.S. Highway 90 and crashed underneath a commercial truck that had slowed down behind another vehicle. Mansfield was 23 miles (37 km) from New Orleans, where she had been scheduled to appear on a noon television program. Although she was not decapitated, as would first be reported, the top of her head was sheared off by the impact. Three of her children, who were sitting in the back of the car, were hospitalized with minor injuries.
  - Primo Carnera, 60, Italian boxer and former world heavyweight champion; of cirrhosis of the liver

== June 30, 1967 (Friday) ==
- Moise Tshombe, the former president of Congolese secessionist Katanga province and later prime minister of the Democratic Republic of the Congo, was kidnapped to Algeria, where he would be held under house arrest for the rest of his life. Tshombe, who had lived in exile in Spain since 1965, had been convicted by a court in Leopoldville in absentia for treason, and had been given a death sentence on March 12. Persuaded to invest in the purchase of land in Spain, Tshombe boarded a Hawker Siddeley air taxi for a 10-minute flight from Ibiza to Palma de Majorca, along with his two Spanish bodyguards, four other passengers, and the two British pilots. As the plane flew over the Mediterranean Sea between the two islands, one of the passengers, French criminal Francis Bodenan, hijacked the aircraft at gunpoint and directed the pilots to an air base at Boufarik.
- Thai Airways International Flight 601, a Caravelle jet flying from Taipei to Hong Kong, crashed into Kowloon Bay as it was making its approach to the runway at Kai Tak Airport. Rescue boats and helicopters raced to the scene and were able to save 56 of the 80 people on board.
- NASA, the American space agency, announced the selection of U.S. Air Force Major Robert H. Lawrence Jr. as the first African-American astronaut. Less than six months later, however, Lawrence would be killed while training a pilot to fly an F-104 Starfighter jet.
