= Obolo, Akwa Ibom =

Town in Nigeria

Obolo is a proposed state to be created from Akwa Ibom State/ Rivers State in the south-south Nigeria.
