= September 1967 =

Month of 1967

<<	September 1967					>>
Su	Mo	Tu	We	Th	Fr	Sa
					1	2
3	4	5	6	7	8	9
10	11	12	13	14	15	16
17	18	19	20	21	22	23
24	25	26	27	28	29	30

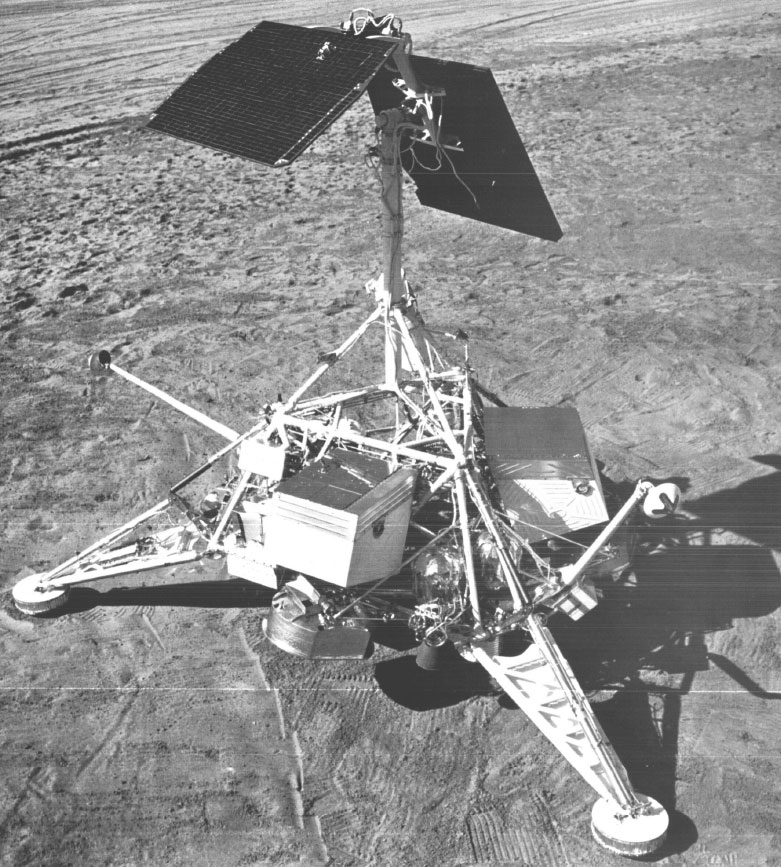
September 11, 1967: Surveyor 5 lands on Moon

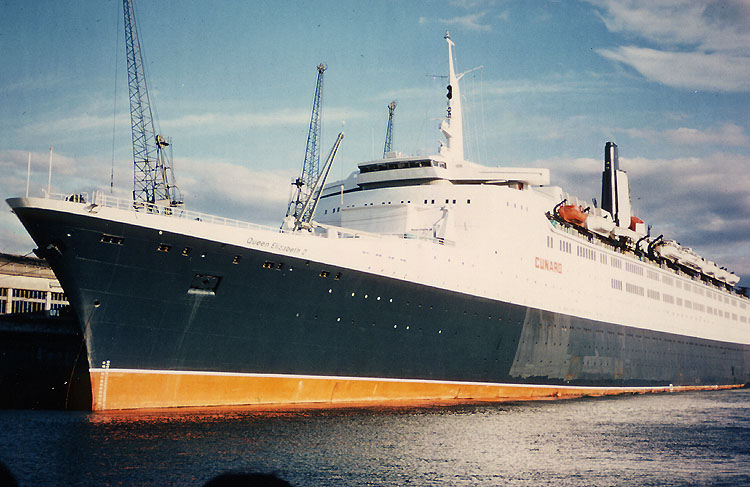
September 20, 1967: The Queen Elizabeth 2 launched

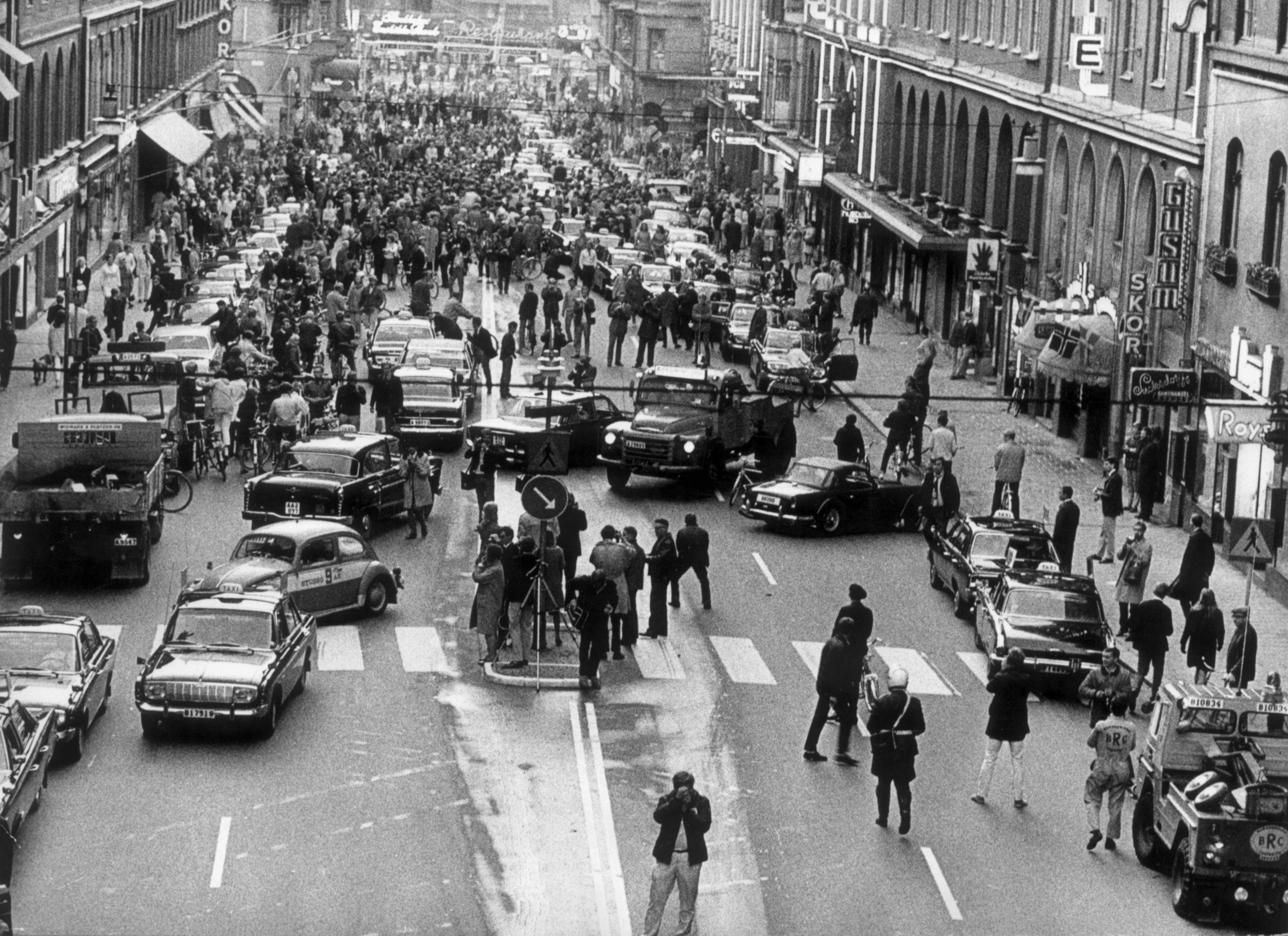
September 3, 1967: Sweden goes from left-side-of-the-road to right-side-of-the-road

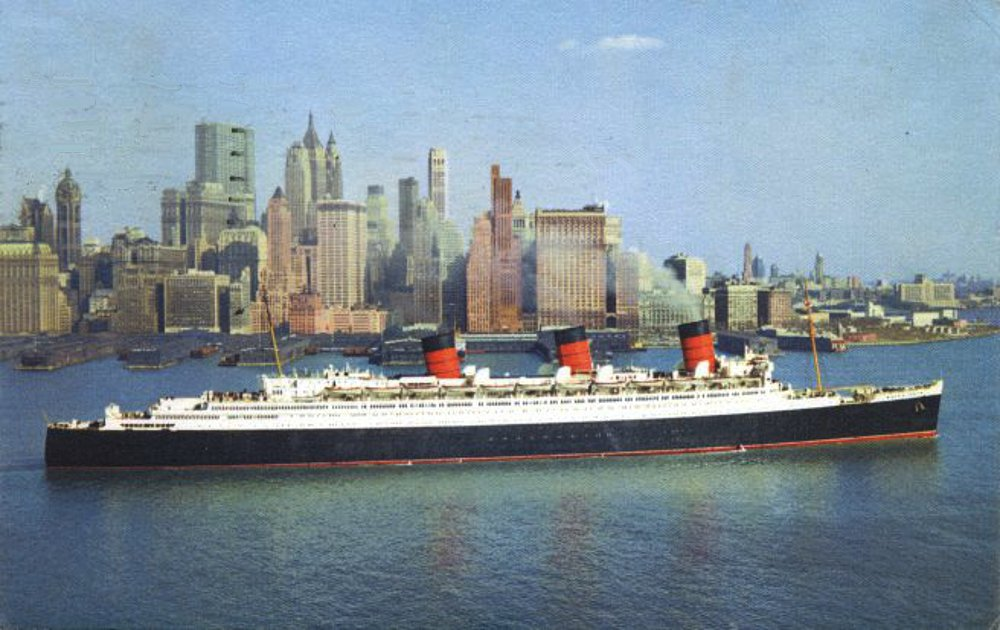
September 27, 1967: The Queen Mary retired

The following events occurred in September 1967:

== September 1, 1967 (Friday) ==
- The eight member nations of the Arab League passed the Khartoum Resolution as their leaders met in Khartoum, the capital of the Sudan. The United Arab Republic (Egypt), Syria and Jordan, all of whom lost territory in the Six-Day War, were joined by Algeria, Lebanon, Iraq, Kuwait and the Sudan in approving a series of pledges regarding a common policy toward the nation of Israel. In the process, the existence of a common enemy brought the Arab states closer together and allowed them to resolve their own disputes. Egypt's President Gamal Abdel Nasser dropped further plans to overthrow the monarchies in Saudi Arabia and its neighbors. The adherents to the resolution agreed on seven points—continued planning for war against Israel, ending the boycott of oil exports to the United States and the United Kingdom, ending participation in the Yemen Civil War, rebuilding of Egypt and Jordan, and "the three no's"—"no peace with Israel, no recognition of Israel, and no negotiations with the Israelis".
- Thurgood Marshall was sworn into office as the first African-American justice of the Supreme Court of the United States, after being confirmed by the U.S. Senate. The event, not announced in advance, took place in the office of the oldest justice on the Court, Hugo Black, who administered the oath office and congratulated his new colleague. A second, public ceremony was held again on October 2 when the Court began its new term.
- At a rally in Beijing, leaders of the Chinese Communist Party reprimanded the Red Guards for burning both the Soviet and British diplomatic missions in August and told the crowd that violence had done "great damage to the Cultural Revolution." According to a radio broadcast made two days later, the Guards were directed to cease violence entirely, an order to which the revolutionaries were slow to respond.
- At the close of a nine-day meeting in Prague, the delegates to the International Astronomical Union voted to delay the naming of locations on the far side of the Moon for three years, and to set up a special committee that would consider names and deliver its recommendations at the next IAU conference, scheduled for 1970 at the University of Sussex in England.
- Louis Armstrong released "What a Wonderful World", his most famous single during his career. It topped the pop chart in the United Kingdom in April 1968, but performed poorly in the United States because Larry Newton, the president of ABC Records, disliked the song and refused to promote it.
- NASA conditionally approved the "Orbital Workshop", made by McDonnell Douglas and designed to be put into Earth orbit with a Saturn IV-B rocket, with design changes to create a space laboratory designed for use by astronauts as part of the Apollo Applications Program. The orbital workshop would become the basis for the first U.S. space station, Skylab.
- Died:
  - Ilse Koch, 60, German war criminal known as "The Bitch of Buchenwald", hanged herself in the Bavarian prison of Aichach
  - James Dunn, 65, American film actor and 1945 Academy Award winner for Best Supporting Actor for A Tree Grows in Brooklyn
  - Siegfried Sassoon, 80, English poet and soldier

== September 2, 1967 (Saturday) ==
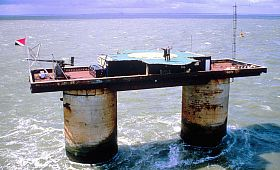
The Principality of Sealand

- Roy Bates, a retired British Army major, proclaimed the location Principality of Sealand, an independent micronation, at an abandoned anti-aircraft platform in international waters on the North Sea, formerly HM Fort Roughs, that had not been used since World War II. Bates made the decision after learning that the UK had no jurisdiction over the 5,940 square feet (552 m^{2}) platform, located 7.5 miles (12.1 km) off of the coast of Felixstowe, Suffolk, is not recognized by any other nation. The sovereignty of Sealand is not recognized by any nation.
- Died: Francis Ouimet, 74, American golfer and winner of the 1913 U.S. Open

== September 3, 1967 (Sunday) ==
3rd of September Dagen Högertrafikomläggningen

- At 5:00 in the morning local time, all road traffic in Sweden switched from driving on the left hand side of the road to driving on the right hand side. Preparation for Dagen H (Dagen Högertrafikomläggningen or "day of right-sided traffic conversion") had been made for the past four years. Beginning at 1:00 in the morning, all non-essential traffic had been barred from the roads. At 4:50, all remaining vehicles were brought to a stop at checkpoints. Ten minutes later, police directed vehicles to move to the other side of the road.
- Nguyen Van Thieu was elected President of South Vietnam after receiving a plurality of 4.74 million votes. Thiệu and his running mate, vice-presidential candidate Nguyen Cao Ky got 1,649,561 of the votes cast, or 34.8% of the total. The runner-up, Truong Dinh Dzu, had campaigned on a platform of negotiating with the Viet Cong and got 817,120 votes or 17.2%; former President Phan Khac Suu received 513,374 (10.8%) and former Prime Minister Tran Van Huong had 474,100 (10%).
- The game show What's My Line? broadcast its last episode after having been a television mainstay on CBS since February 2, 1950. John Charles Daly, the last of the original members, not only moderated, but was also the myster guesyt on the last episode, which included longtime panelists Arlene Francis and Bennett Cerf.
- Born: Luis Gonzalez, American baseball player; in Tampa
- Died: Muhammad bin Ladin, 59, Saudi Arabian billionaire, construction magnate, and father of future al-Qaeda terrorist leader Osama bin Laden, was killed when the Beechcraft airplane he was in crashed during a landing near the village of Oom, along with his American pilot, Jim Harrington, and two other passengers.

== September 4, 1967 (Monday) ==
- Michigan Governor George Romney, who was considering a run for the Republican Party nomination for the presidency in 1968, appeared on "The Lou Gordon Show" on Detroit's WKBD-TV for an interview, and was asked to explain why he had changed his position from support to opposition of the Vietnam War and said that when he and other American politicians were given a tour of South Vietnam in 1965, "I just had the greatest brainwashing that anybody can get when you go over to Vietnam, not only by the generals, but also by the diplomatic corps." "For all practical purposes", a historian would write later, "that single honest remark removed Romney from serious presidential consideration."
- In Centreville, Mississippi, 25 armed members of the African-American group Deacons for Defense intervened when a mob of white supremacists attempted to disrupt a demonstration for black voting rights in Wilkinson County. When one of the white members pointed a gun at the demonstrators, the group from Natchez began unloading weapons and the mob dispersed without incident. According to one activist, "hearing the name 'Deacons for Defense' invoked was almost as effective in scattering the racist mob as the guns".
- Operation Swift began as the 1st and 3rd battalions of the United States Marines 5th Regiment engaged the North Vietnamese Army and the Viet Cong in the Que Son Valley in the Quảng Nam and Quảng Tín provinces of South Vietnam. Over a period of five days, 114 Americans and 376 North Vietnamese were killed. A former Viet Cong soldier would observe 30 years later, "in the Que Son Valley in 1967, we killed more Americans than at any time or place during the war."
- West Germany amended its patent law to allow protection for chemical patents, including those for pharmaceutical medicines.
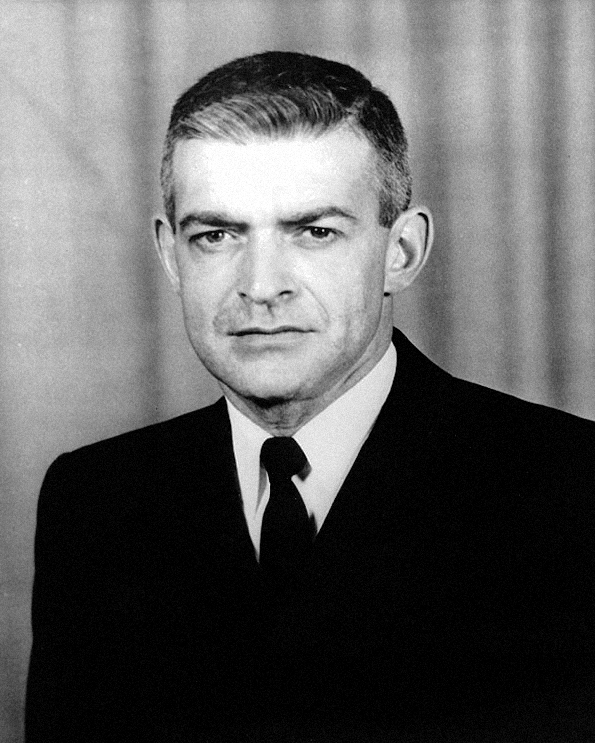
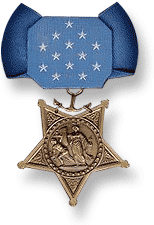
Father Capodanno
- Died: Father Vincent R. Capodanno, 38, U.S. Navy chaplain and Roman Catholic priest, was killed in battle while rendering aid to U.S. Marines who had been ambushed by the North Vietnamese Army in the Que Son Valley. Lt. Capodanno would be awarded the Medal of Honor posthumously for his heroism in rushing into the battle zone despite being wounded by an exploding mortar round. A Navy frigate, the USS Capodanno, would later be named in his honor.

== September 5, 1967 (Tuesday) ==
- CSA Flight 523, an Ilyushin Il-18D Czechoslovak airliner on its way from Prague to Havana, crashed shortly after taking off from Gander International Airport in Newfoundland in Canada, killing 37 of the 69 people on board. As "a gesture of gratitude for the help of rescue workers and medical staff", the Czechoslovak government would donate the main part of its Expo 67 pavilion to the provincial government of Newfoundland.
- The People's Republic of China signed an agreement with the African nations of Tanzania and Zambia for the construction of the TanZam Railway line, with an interest free loan that would eventually be for 406 million U.S. dollars. The 1,160 mi (1,870 km) long line would be constructed from Kapiri Mposhi in Zambia to the Tanzanian capital, Dar es Salaam, and would open in 1975.
- The British science fiction television series The Prisoner, created by and starring Patrick McGoohan, was broadcast for the first time, premiering in Canada on the CTV Television Network. The show would not appear in the United Kingdom until September 29. Syndication in the United States would begin on June 1, 1968.
- Hurricane Beulah formed in the Caribbean Sea and then began traveling a west-northwest course. Over a period of 17 days, it would grow and diminish as it swept across Mexico and Texas, killing 59 people and causing more than one billion dollars in property damage.
- Chairman Mao ordered the People's Liberation Army to disarm China's Red Guards, a move that would culminate in the massacre of thousands of the revolutionaries on August 8, 1968.
- Born:
  - Matthias Sammer, German soccer football star, midfielder on the East Germany national team (1986–1990) and the Germany national team (1990–1997), and 1996 European Footballer of the Year; in Dresden
  - Jane Sixsmith, English field hockey star for the England and Great Britain teams; in Sutton Coldfield

== September 6, 1967 (Wednesday) ==
- Walter E. Washington was appointed as the first African-American mayor of a major American city, as President Lyndon Johnson announced his nomination as Mayor-Commissioner of Washington, D.C. For the previous 93 years, there had been no mayor for the nation's capital, which was administered instead by three appointed commissioners.
- On the single bloodiest day of the battle in the Que Son Valley, 69 U.S. Marines and 149 of the North Vietnamese and Viet Cong forces were killed. In addition, 201 Marines and an undetermined number of the North Vietnamese were wounded.
- Born:
  - Macy Gray (stage name for Natalie Renee McIntyre), American R&B singer and actress; in Canton, Ohio
  - Milan Lukić, Bosnian Serb war criminal; in Foča, SR Bosnia and Herzegovina, Yugoslavia
  - William DuVall, American musician for Alice in Chains; in Washington, D.C.
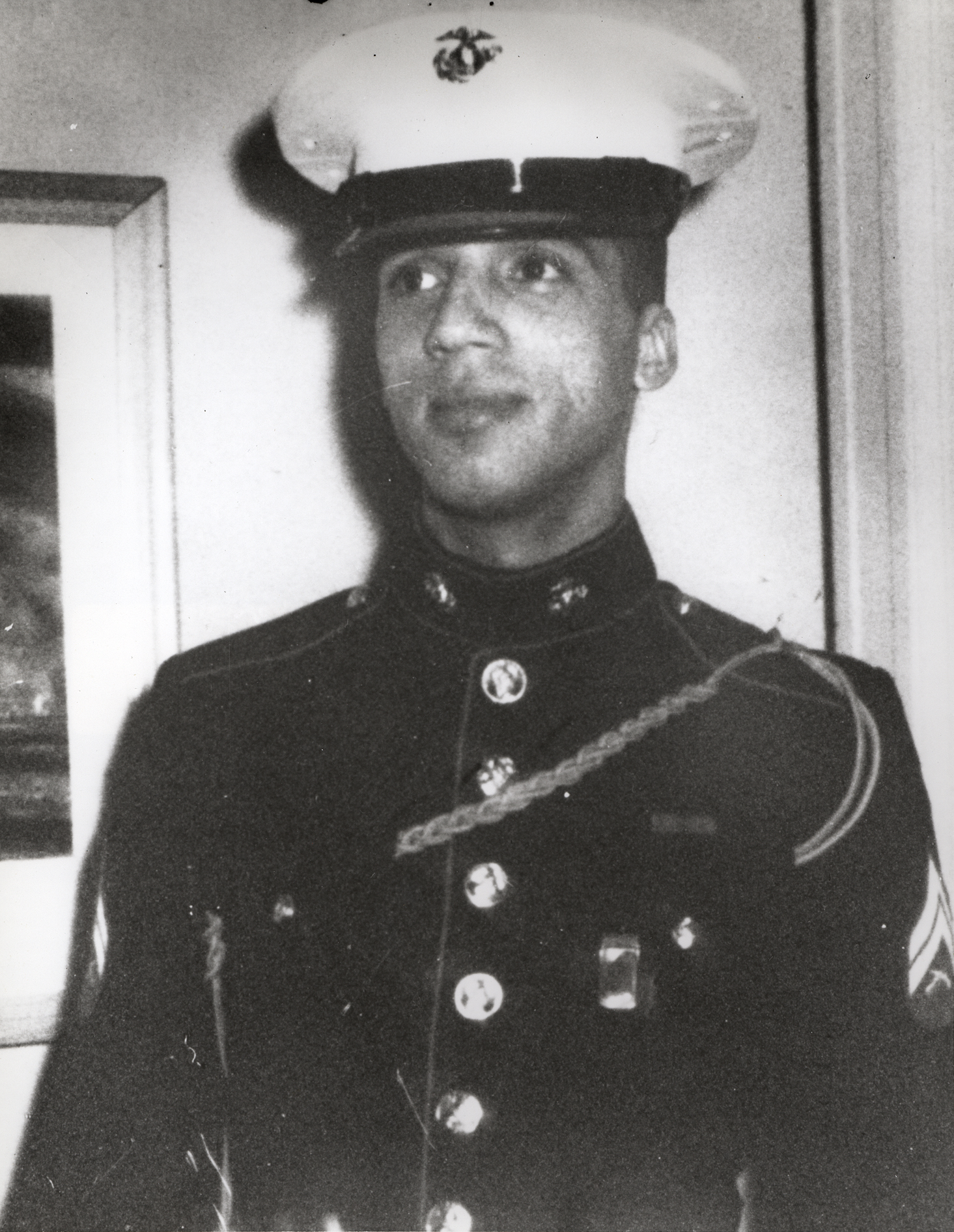
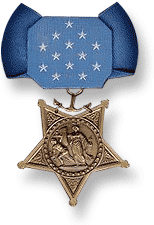
Sergeant Davis USMC
- Died:
  - U.S. Marine Sergeant Rodney Maxwell Davis, 25, was killed when he jumped upon a live grenade to protect his fellow Marines from the blast. Davis, an African-American and one of the casualties of the battle of Que Son Valley, was credited with saving five other soldiers in the 2nd Platoon from death, and at least seven others from serious injury. He would be awarded the Medal of Honor, posthumously, in 1969. A U.S. Navy missile frigate, USS Rodney M. Davis, would later be named in his honor.
  - William Francis Gibbs, 81, American naval architect who designed the mass-produced Liberty ship freighters during World War II

== September 7, 1967 (Thursday) ==
- The United States launched Biosatellite 2 from Cape Kennedy, with a cargo of insects and other life forms to study the effects of weightlessness and gamma radiation on cellular development. NASA would successfully recover the craft two days later. The first Biosatellite, sent aloft on December 17, 1966, had burned up in the atmosphere after the malfunction of its retrorockets prevented it from a controlled re-entry. The living things on board included "parasitic wasps, flour beetles, vinegar gnats, and amoebae", as well as paramecia and frog eggs, wheat seedlings and bread mold.
- The Flying Nun premiered on ABC at 8:00 in the evening. Starring Sally Field as a Roman Catholic novice in Puerto Rico who discovered that she had the power of controlled flight ("Whenever a stiff wind caught the starched cornette worn by her order, off she went"), the show was based on a novel, The Fifteenth Pelican, written by Tere Rios and would run for three seasons.
- The member states of the European Economic Community signed the Convention on the Provision of Mutual Assistance of Customs Authorities at Naples.
- Walter Ulbricht and Willi Stoph of East Germany and Todor Zhivkov and Georgi Traykov of Bulgaria signed a mutual defense pact at Sofia.
- Hungary and the Soviet Union signed a treaty of "Friendship, Cooperation and Mutual Assistance" at Budapest.

== September 8, 1967 (Friday) ==
- U.S. President Lyndon Johnson met at his ranch in Texas with two longtime friends, Texas Governor John Connally and U.S. Congressman Jake Pickle, as well as his wife, Lady Bird Johnson, to get advice about announcing a decision not to run for re-election in 1968. According to Mrs. Johnson's biographer, Johnson intended to announce his decision in December, and Connally argued that Johnson should announce his decision in his State of the Union address in 1968. Johnson would reconsider his decision and attempt a run for a renomination before withdrawing on March 31, 1968.
- In Uganda, a Constituent Assembly, composed of members of Parliament whose terms had expired, approved a new national constitution that abolished the five constituent kingdoms that had co-existed with the presidency, and gave President Milton Obote greater powers "at the expense of the cabinet, judiciary and legislature." The kingdoms of Ankole, Buganda, Bunyoro, Busoga and Tooro were incorporated into the Republic of Uganda, and their traditional monarchs were sent into exile. The monarchies would be restored in 1993.
- Purr-Chance to Dream, the final Tom and Jerry theatrical short, was released to theaters with a title that was a pun on a quote from Shakespeare's Hamlet ("to sleep, perchance to dream"), after which there were no further MGM releases of cartoons to precede the featured attraction. An author would comment later, "It is the final irony that, in the last Tom and Jerry cartoon, Purr-chance to Dream, Tom actually takes sleeping pills to help him sleep - a sleep, of course, from which he never wakes."
- Born: Eerik-Niiles Kross, Director of the KAPO, the Estonian Internal Security Service; in Tallinn
- Died: D. Ewen Cameron, 65, Scottish-born psychiatrist

== September 9, 1967 (Saturday) ==
- Greece's Prime Minister Konstantinos Kollias and Turkey's Prime Minister Süleyman Demirel began an unprecedented series of summit meetings, traveling to each other's nations during the weekend to discuss their differences regarding the island republic of Cyprus. On Saturday, Kollias and his aides drove across the border to meet Demirel in the Turkish city of Keşan. The following day, Demirel and his associates traveled over to the Greek side to meet Kollias at Alexandroupoli. At the close of the summit, the two men issued a joint press release that declared that the two men "expressed their belief that the long-term interests of both countries require the strengthening of the ties of friendship, good neighborliness, and cooperation between the two countries, within the spirit of cordiality created by the two great statesmen Atatürk and Venizelos, and by taking into consideration the fact that they belong to the same alliance."
- The three American television networks premiered their Saturday morning cartoon lineups on the same day, most of them featuring established superheroes or creating new ones. ABC featured Marvel Comics heroes, with The Fantastic Four at 9:30 and Spider-Man at 10:00, while CBS relied on DC Comics for The Superman/Aquaman Hour of Adventure at 11:30. NBC offered Super President, in which President of the United States James Norcross secretly worked as a super hero in his spare time, in a 30-minute show that also featured Spy Shadow. Other shows introduced during the day were the comedy George of the Jungle (which included Super Chicken and Tom Slick) on ABC, The Herculoids on CBS and Birdman and the Galaxy Trio on NBC.
- Progressive Conservative Party of Canada delegates assembled at "the largest political convention in Canadian history", and overwhelmingly rejected the bid by former Prime Minister John G. Diefenbaker to retain leadership. Nova Scotia Premier Robert L. Stanfield was picked as the new leader on the fifth round of balloting. Diefenbaker and 10 other candidates had sought support from a record 2,256 voting delegates at Toronto's Maple Leaf Gardens, and he finished in fifth place on the first ballot, dropping out after going from 271 to 172 to 114 votes. In the final ballot, with only two contenders, Stanfield edged Mantioba Premier Dufferin Roblin, 1,150 to 969.
- The pilot episode of Rowan & Martin's Laugh-In, which would become the number one rated television show in the nation in 1968, was shown as a "sneak preview" on the NBC television network at 9:00 p.m. Eastern time. Hosted by comedians Dan Rowan and Dick Martin, the fast-paced variety show featured an ensemble of regular players and would become a weekly series on January 22, 1968. The guest stars on the first telecast were Barbara Feldon, Ken Berry and Pamela Austin.
- The Oakland Clippers won the first, and only championship of the original National Professional Soccer League by beating the Baltimore Bays, 4 to 1, in the second part of a two-game aggregate match. The Bays had won the first game, 1-0, at Baltimore on September 3 before 16,619 people. Only 9,037 paid to watch the second game, played at the Oakland-Alameda Coliseum. Based on the aggregate of the two games, the Clippers had a 4 to 2 win.
- Born: Akshay Kumar (Rajiv Hari Om Bhatia), Indian film star and one of the most successful of Bollywood actors; in Amritsar, Punjab state

== September 10, 1967 (Sunday) ==
- The CBS television network censored The Smothers Brothers Comedy Hour, in advance of the evening broadcast, by editing out the performance of Pete Seeger's antiwar song "Waist Deep in the Big Muddy". Seeger, who had been blacklisted from commercial television for 17 years, had been allowed to perform the song before the studio audience, but the tape shown on television only showed Seeger performing the song "Wimoweh" and Tommy Smothers asking Seeger if he was going to sing "that song". The tape then showed a closeup of Seeger's face, and skipped to the next portion of the program. The CBS objection had been Seeger's closing verse, "Now every time I read the papers/That old feelin' comes on/We're waist deep in the Big Muddy/And the big fool says to push on." Executives at CBS considered the words to be an obvious insult directed at President Johnson. After criticism in the press, the song would be allowed in the rerun of the show on February 25, 1968.
- Frank Sinatra, a star attraction at the Copa Room Sands Hotel and Casino in Las Vegas since 1953, got into a fight with hotel management when his credit at the casino was terminated. In the fracas that followed after he had gone on an angry rampage, casino operator Carl Cohen knocked out two of Sinatra's front teeth by punching the singing legend in the mouth. Sinatra, who had been a part owner of the hotel until forced by the State of Nevada to sell his interests because of associates with mob boss Sam Giancana, severed ties with the Sands permanently to sing at the new Caesars Palace hotel.
- Voters in the British Overseas Territory of Gibraltar, ceded by Spain to the United Kingdom in 1713, turned out for a referendum on the colony's future. Presented with a choice of "voluntarily to retain their link with the United Kingdom" or "to pass under Spanish sovereignty", the result was 12,138 in favor of staying, and only 44 for Spanish control.
- The United States began bombing North Vietnam's third-largest port city, Cam Pha, on the recommendations of the U.S. Joint Chiefs of Staff and despite the objections of U.S. Secretary of Defense Robert S. McNamara.

== September 11, 1967 (Monday) ==
- The unmanned American lunar lander Surveyor 5 made a soft landing on the Moon in the Mare Tranquillitatis (Sea of Tranquility) at 00:46 UTC (7:46 p.m. on September 10, U.S. Eastern time) and began transmitting information back to Earth. Over the next three weeks, it would send 18,006 television images of the lunar surface, along with data drawn from chemical analysis of the soil. Unlike previous landers, Surveyor 5 would also respond immediately to a reactivation command after two weeks in deep freeze during a lunar night period. On July 20, 1969, Apollo 11 would land in the Mare Tranquillitatis at a location only 15 miles (24 km) from Surveyor 5.
- China and India fought a battle at the Nathu La pass through the Himalayan Mountains, at Sikkim near the border with Tibet. The 18th Rajput Regiment of the Indian Army was protecting an engineering company that was erecting a border fence, when the soldiers were fired upon by Chinese troops. India retaliated with mortars. Over the next four days, 65 Indian soldiers from the 18th Rajput and the 2nd Grenadiers were killed, and 145 wounded, while the Chinese suffered more than 400 casualties that included an unannounced number of deaths.
- The Carol Burnett Show premiered on CBS at 10:00 in the evening, and would become one of the most popular variety shows of the 1970s, ending in 1978.
- Born:
  - Harry Connick Jr., American musician, actor and talk show host, winner of three Grammy Awards and two Emmy Awards; in New Orleans
  - Sung Jae-gi, South Korean men's rights activist and anti-feminist; in Daegu (d. 2013)

== September 12, 1967 (Tuesday) ==
- CIA Director Richard Helms presented U.S. President Johnson with a classified report titled "Implications of an Unfavorable Outcome in Vietnam", prepared by analysts in the Office of National Estimates. According to the analysis, "failure would not come as a result of a complete military and political collapse of the U.S. effort in Vietnam, but would evolve from the likely compromise solution that would result from a peace settlement... to the advantage of the Vietnamese Communists". Moreover, the CIA told Johnson, there would be "permanent damage... to the United States in the international arena", internal dissension within the U.S., and destabilization of the other non-Communist nations in Southeast Asia.
- Born: Louis C.K. (Louis Szekely), American comedian; in Washington, D.C.
- Died: Vladimir Bartol, 64, bestselling Slovenian language novelist

== September 13, 1967 (Wednesday) ==
- Aqueous film forming foam (AFFF), specially designed for fighting jet fuel explosions and suppressing explosions, was given its first public demonstration, after having been kept secret for several years. The exhibition and use of the orange-colored polyurethane foam took place at the Wright-Patterson Air Force Base near Dayton, Ohio.
- Inscape, composed by Aaron Copland, was given its first performance, debuting at the University of Michigan in Ann Arbor with the New York Philharmonic Orchestra as conducted by Leonard Bernstein.
- Born: Michael Johnson, American sprinter, holder of the world record in the 200 meter event from 1996 to 2008 and in the 400 meter event from 1999 to 2016; gold medalist in three Olympics and five world championships; in Dallas
- Died:
  - Abdel Hakim Amer, 47, former Field Marshal of the Egyptian Army and one-time Vice-President of Egypt, committed suicide in prison by swallowing poison. Because he had been a friend and one-time heir apparent of President Gamel Abdel Nasser, "the disgraced Amer was given the choice of being tried for high treason, with the inevitability of conviction and execution, or dying by his own hand". After his death, he was given a state funeral with full military honors.
  - Varian Fry, 69, American journalist who helped more than 2,000 Jewish and anti-Nazi refugees escape Nazi-occupied France during World War II; in 1994, he would become the first American to be recognized by Israel as one of the Righteous among the Nations.
  - Russell L. Rogers, 39, American test pilot and astronaut in the X-20 Dyna-Soar program, was killed in the explosion of his F-105 jet near Kadena AFB, Okinawa, Japan.

== September 14, 1967 (Thursday) ==
- Ewa Klobukowska of Poland, one of two women who held the women's world record for the fastest 100 meter dash, became the first athlete to be disqualified for failing a gender verification test, commonly referred to as the "sex test". Klobukowska, who had been part of the Polish 400 meter relay team that had won the gold medal in the 1966 European championships, had passed the test given at that time. Her records would be taken away from her, but Klobukowska would prove her femininity beyond a doubt, a few years later, by becoming pregnant and giving birth.
- Batman began a third season on ABC despite declining ratings, and added actress Yvonne Craig as Batgirl in an attempt to inject new life into the series. In place of the twice-weekly episodes that had included a cliffhanger, the network allowed only a weekly 30-minute episode that ended with the appearance of the following week's villain. "Camp had been replaced by silliness", it would be noted later, "and America had been cured of its Batmania 'virus'."
- The banknotes formerly issued by the East African Currency Board ceased to be legal tender in Tanzania, Uganda and Kenya, but the old coins associated with the East African shilling remained in circulation in all three nations.
- Ironside, starring Raymond Burr as a wheelchair-using police detective, premiered at 8:30 p.m. on NBC. On March 28, 1967, the made-for-TV movie A Man Called Ironside had received high ratings as a return of Burr, who had been best known for portraying defense attorney Perry Mason in a popular TV series based on the character created by Erle Stanley Gardner.
- Died: Walt Bond, 29, American Major League Baseball player who played six seasons in the majors (and 10 games for the Minnesota Twins in 1967, ending on May 10) despite being diagnosed with leukemia

== September 15, 1967 (Friday) ==
- The Foreign Ministry of Indonesia announced that it was closing its embassy in Beijing and ordering all of its staff to leave China. Foreign Minister Adam Malik added that Chinese authorities had not given the diplomatic staff exit permits, and that Indonesia wanted to avoid severing its diplomatic ties with the People's Republic.
- Only 12 days after he finished in second place in the South Vietnam presidential election, Truong Dinh Dzu was sentenced to nine months in jail and a $27,711 fine, moments after being convicted of illegal money transfers and writing a bad check.

== September 16, 1967 (Saturday) ==
- Vladimir Tkachenko, a 25-year-old Soviet physicist who was working at Birmingham University in the United Kingdom, was abducted from the streets of London by two agents of the Soviet KGB intelligence agency, apparently because the Russians believed that he was preparing to defect to the West. After witnesses saw him forcibly being carried into the Soviet Embassy, police from Scotland Yard intervened. Tkachenko had been drugged and driven to Heathrow Airport and was seen being forcibly put on to an Aeroflot jet, and the police stopped the plane from leaving and took him into protective custody. Two days later, after Tkachenko himself protested while in a psychiatric hospital, police returned him to the Soviet Embassy and allowed him to return to Moscow.
- The newly constructed town of Exmouth, Western Australia, and the new U.S. Naval Communication Station North West Cape were dedicated in ceremonies overseen by Australia's Prime Minister Harold Holt. Exmouth had been constructed to house the civilian employees of the U.S. Navy's station. After Holt's accidental death three months later, the station would be renamed in his honor.
- The detective series Mannix, starring Armenian-American actor Mike Connors as a private investigator, began an eight-season run on American television.

== September 17, 1967 (Sunday) ==
- A riot during a soccer football match in Kayseri in Turkey left 44 dead and 600 injured. The occasion was a Turkish League Second Division meeting between Kayserispor and visiting Sivasspor, in front of a crowd of 21,000 at Atatürk Stadium. Roughly 5,000 fans of Sivasspor had traveled from Sivas to attend. In the 20th minute, Küçük Oktay scored a goal for Kayseri, and a fight broke out between players from both teams. The referee issued a red card to eject one of the Kayseri players, then reversed his decision and allowed the player to stay. Fans then began to throw rocks at each other, and thousands of Sivas fans began rushing toward the exit gates, where those in front were crushed by the press of the crowd behind them. Outside the stadium and on the highway back home, Sivas vandalized cars that had Kayseri Province license tags. Over the next several days, violent riots took place in Sivas and in Kayseri.
- Jim Morrison of The Doors defied CBS in a live telecast of The Ed Sullivan Show, after initially agreeing to a producer's request to alter the lyrics to their #1 hit, "Light My Fire". Morrison had been asked to change the lyric "Girl, we couldn't get much higher" to "Girl, we couldn't get much better", out of the production staff's fear concern about the word "high" being associated with drug abuse. Given that the word "better" did not rhyme with "You know that I would be a liar", Morrison sang the word anyway. According to one account, "Afterwards, the production staff informed the group that they had been ready to book them on a further six shows. Now, however, they were banned from The Ed Sullivan Show."
- The government of Israel decided to inaugurate an Arabic language television channel under the Israel Broadcasting Authority system, in that households in the newly acquired areas had sets that could receive broadcasts in Arabic from Jordan, Syria and other neighboring countries. Under the plan, implemented on May 14, 1968, IBA Channel 1 would have four hours a day of Arabic language programming and only one-half hour in Hebrew.
- Eight tourists were killed and 74 others injured when the Mount Washington Cog Railway in New Hampshire derailed and plunged into a gorge while on its way back down a steep grade from the 6,288-foot (1,917 m) summit of Mount Washington. An investigation found later that human error, in the form of an open switch, had caused the crash.
- The Who performed their hit song "My Generation" on The Smothers Brothers Comedy Hour. An explosive was set off which made Pete Townshend permanently deaf in one ear and injured Keith Moon when a cymbal cut into his arm, but which also gave The Who enormous publicity.
- Died: Adrienne von Speyr, 64, Swiss physician, author on Christian mysticism and theologian

== September 18, 1967 (Monday) ==
- U.S. Defense Secretary McNamara announced in a speech to journalists in San Francisco that the United States would deploy a limited "Chinese-oriented" anti-ballistic missile (ABM) system to protect against any threat posed by attacks from the People's Republic of China, which had no missiles within range at the time. Administration plans for a $40 billion ABM system (which McNamara had opposed) to defend against a Soviet Union attack gave way to a five billion dollar proposal. The first 22 pages of McNamara's 25-page speech had been a policy statement that suggested that the U.S. would not deploy an ABMs, with the last three giving notice of the deployment of Sentinel missiles, something that "led many to believe that McNamara was forced to change his speech".
- Love Is a Many Splendored Thing debuted on U.S. daytime television and would become the first soap opera to deal with an interracial relationship. The show was a sequel of sorts to the popular 1955 film of the same name and the bestselling 1952 autobiographical novel A Many-Splendoured Thing by Dr. Han Suyin, and the main character, played by Nancy Hsueh, was the Amerasian daughter of the Chinese doctor and the American war correspondent in the film. However, the show would become controversial when Hsueh, as Mia Elliott, began a romantic relationship with a white character, and would be written out of the show by the spring of 1968.
- Born: Masami Ihara, Japanese soccer football defender with 122 games for the national team from 1988 to 1999; in Koka, Shiga Prefecture
- Died: John Cockcroft, 70, British physicist and winner of the 1951 Nobel Prize in Physics

== September 19, 1967 (Tuesday) ==
- Four boys in Lincoln, Nebraska, ranging in age from 8 to 11 years old, were killed in the explosion of a live 37mm artillery shell that had been given away as a souvenir by an officer who had been stationed at Schilling Air Force Base in Kansas. A weapons technician at the Air Force base had inspected the shell, concluded that it was inert, and cleared it to be taken home by the departing officer.
- Oliver Tambo, the acting president of the African National Congress, and James Chikerema, Vice-President of the Zimbabwe African People's Union, announced a military alliance between the ANC and ZAPU, which were fighting the white minority regimes in South Africa and Rhodesia, respectively.
- The Kingdom of Thailand sold offshore oil exploration rights to six different oil companies or consortiums, dividing the area within its 12 nautical mile territorial limit into 17 "exploration blocks".
- Former Foreign Minister Corneliu Mănescu of Romania was elected as the first President of the United Nations General Assembly to represent a Communist nation.
- Central Texas College, established in Killeen, Texas, opened for its first day of classes, with an enrollment of 2,081 students.
- Born:
  - Aleksandr Karelin, Russian Greco-Roman wrestler, three-time Olympic gold medalist (1988, 1992 and 1996), and winner of nine consecutive world championships between 1989 and 1999; in Novosibirsk, Russian SFSR, Soviet Union
  - Jim Abbott, American Major League Baseball pitcher who overcame the handicap of being born without a right hand and played in the American League from 1989 to 1999; in Flint, Michigan
- Died: Monica Proietti, 29, Canadian bank robber known as "Machine Gun Molly" for her choice of weapon during 19 prior bank holdups in Montreal, was killed by Montreal police after fleeing from the holdup of a credit union.

== September 20, 1967 (Wednesday) ==
- The Cunard Line cruise ship Queen Elizabeth 2 was launched onto Scotland's Clyde River after being christened by the monarch for whom it was named, Queen Elizabeth II of the United Kingdom. The name of the new 58,000-ton liner had been kept secret until the ceremony. For two minutes after shipyard workers knocked away the timbers that had been holding the ship in place, it failed to slide down the slipway as expected, but finally began its descent amid cheers from 30,000 spectators.
- Nigerian Army troops routed rebels in the African nation's Western Region and recaptured Benin City, which had been taken by the Army of Biafra on August 9. The future Nigerian President, General Murtala Mohammed, forced Biafran Brigadier General Victor Banjo and his 7,000 troops to retreat, and brought an end to the short-lived Republic of Benin. When General Banjo arrived back in the Biafran capital, he and three of his officers were promptly arrested and put on trial for treason.
- After Egyptian ships violated a United Nations truce by sailing into the southern end of the Suez Canal, off limits by agreement to both sides, the Israel Defense Forces on the eastern bank of the Suez fired shells, sinking two of the ships near Port Tewfik. Egypt said that 44 civilians in Port Tewfik and Port Suez were killed, and 170 wounded, by Israeli shelling.
- Born: Kristen Johnston, American television and film actress best known as Sally Solomon on 3rd Rock from the Sun, winner of two Primetime Emmy Awards for Outstanding Supporting Actress in a Comedy Series; in Washington, D.C.

== September 21, 1967 (Thursday) ==
- Thailand entered the Vietnam War for the first time, with the arrival of over 2,200 Royal Thai Army soldiers grouped as the Queen's Cobra Regiment. By February 1969, there were 11,250 Thai troops in Vietnam, and in return, Thailand was provided anti-aircraft missiles by the United States.
- Born:
  - Faith Hill, American country music singer; as Audrey Faith Perry in Ridgeland, Mississippi
  - Suman Pokhrel, Nepalese poet, translator and playwright; in Biratnagar
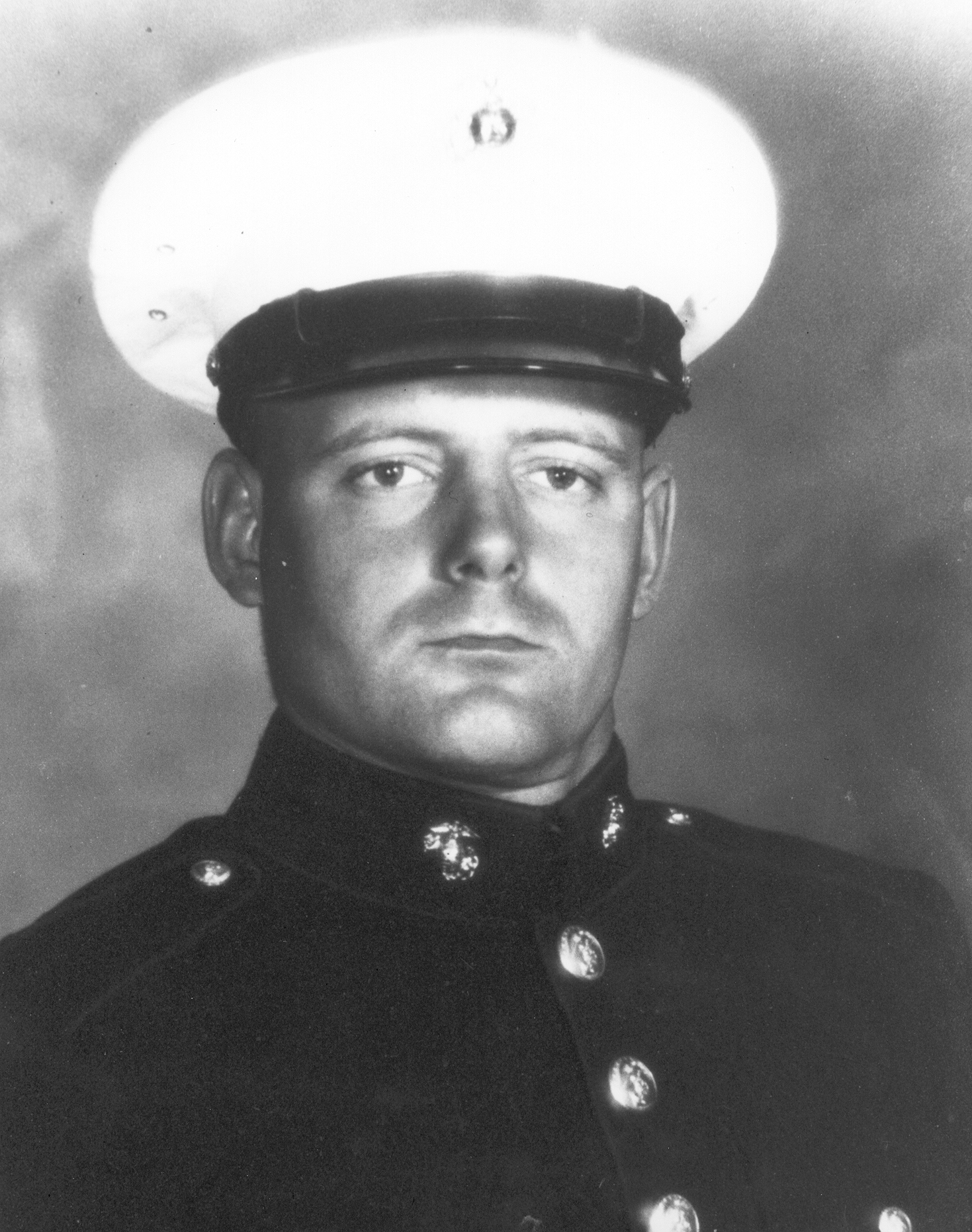
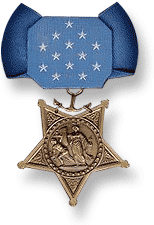
Lance Corporal Barker USMC
- Died: U.S. Marine Lance Corporal Jedh Colby Barker, 22, was killed during Operation Kingfisher when he jumped upon a live grenade to protect his fellow Marines from the blast. He would be awarded the Medal of Honor, posthumously, in 1969.

== September 22, 1967 (Friday) ==
- The cruise ship RMS Queen Mary departed from New York City for its 500th and last time, leaving the Cunard Line Pier with a sendoff ceremony marked by thousands of people cheering and waving and a performance by the 55-person U.S. Merchant Marine Academy band. A reporter noted that "The noisy sendoff contrasted with the Mary's routine departure from Southampton, England, on Sept. 16.... Then only a couple of hundred sightseers lined the dockside and music was supplied through the ship's loudspeaker system."
- Helga – Vom Werden des menschlichen Lebens (Helga – On the Origins of Human Life), promoted as "a film on sex education", premiered with a showing at the Universum Film Theatre in Frankfurt am Main in West Germany. With its unprecedented approach to human sexuality, it would go on to become one of the most commercially successful West German films.
- Dissident Soviet writer Alexander Solzhenitsyn was expelled from the Union of Soviet Writers after a tribunal was held by the Union's secretariat, chaired by Konstantin Fedin. The expulsion brought an end to his ability to publish his work within the Soviet Union.
- North American Aviation, Inc., and Rockwell-Standard Corporation merged as North American Rockwell Corporation.
- Born: Félix Savón, Cuban heavyweight boxer, three-time Olympic gold medalist (1992, 1996 and 2000) and winner of seven world amateur championships between 1986 and 1997; in San Vicente, Guantánamo Province

== September 23, 1967 (Saturday) ==
- Voters in New Zealand overwhelmingly favored a measure to end the limits that had engendered the "Six o'clock swill", where bar patrons drank heavily after getting off of work because alcoholic beverages could not be legally sold after 6:00 in the evening. Given a choice of two closing hours for hotel bars, voters favored extending the time to 10:00 at night by a margin of 582,234 to 328,748. At the beginning of World War I, the limitation had been in place in New Zealand and Australia as an emergency measure; a previous attempt at repeal in New Zealand had failed in 1949. On the same ballot, the nation's first Constitutional Referendum was held on the issue of whether to amend the national constitution to extend the term of members of parliament (and the maximum allowable number of years between elections) from three years to four years. By a 2 to 1 margin (641,623 against and 290,298 for), voters rejected the amendment and decided to keep things the same.
- A group of 14 teenagers in Tucson, Arizona, helped rescue patients from a fire at the Craycroft Nursing Home. The students had been dining at an all-night diner at 2:00 in the morning when they saw emergency vehicles racing to the scene of the fire, and arrived in two carloads, going into the burning building and carrying, leading or pulling patients out. Of the 57 persons inside, 53 were saved.
- Israel officially renamed the recently captured West Bank as the Judea and Samaria Area. "Samaria" was the land north of Jerusalem, conforming to land within the ancient Kingdom of Israel, while "Judea" was on land formerly occupied by the ancient Kingdom of Judah, including East Jerusalem and occupied land to the south.
- Born: Masashi Nakayama, Japanese soccer football player and forward for the Japan national team, 1990 to 2003; in Fujieda, Shizuoka
- Died: Stanislaus Zbyszko (stage name for Jan Stanislaus Cyganiewicz), 88, Polish-born American professional wrestler

== September 24, 1967 (Sunday) ==
- Israel's Prime Minister Levi Eshkol announced Government Decision 839, approving Jewish settlements in lands captured during the Six-Day War, starting with the re-establishment of the West Bank settlement of Kfar Etzion. The decision came almost twenty years after the previous Kfar Etzion settlement had been destroyed, and 157 of its 161 residents massacred, in the 1948 Arab–Israeli War. The act marked the first official approval of an Israeli settlement in the West Bank.
- The Karisoke Research Center for protection of gorillas was founded in Rwanda inside the Volcanoes National Park by primate researcher Dian Fossey. She chose the name because the campsite was located on a ridge in the Virunga Mountains between Mount Karisimbi and Mount Visoke.
- The British Army handed over one-half of the territory of the Aden Protectorate to the Army of the Federation of South Arabia in preparation for its January 9 withdrawal from the Arabian peninsula.
- Surveyor 5 was powered down by commands from the Jet Propulsion Laboratory in Pasadena, California after it had sent back pictures for two weeks.

== September 25, 1967 (Monday) ==
- In Milan, a gang of criminals led by Pietro Cavallero were carrying out their 17th bank robbery when Italian police spotted Cavallero and his three accomplices fleeing in a getaway car. Four people were killed and 22 injured in the chase that followed; Adriano Rovoletto, the car driver, was captured after trying to hide in a crowd. Donato Lopez was captured the next day at his home, and Cavallero and Sante Notarnicola would be arrested on October 3 after eight days on the run. Director Carlo Lizzani would adapt the story to a film, Banditi a Milano (Bandits in Milan).
- Seventeen children in the Mexican city of Tijuana were killed by poison, after eating breakfast, and another 574 people hospitalized. Initially, investigators believed that the milk they had consumed had been tainted but the deaths were soon traced to bread that had been contaminated by parathion, an insecticide that had been stored in a bakery supply warehouse. Contaminated flour and sugar had been shipped to nine bakeries, which in turn distributed its products to retail outlets around the city.
- Died:
  - Stanisław Sosabowski, 75, Polish Army General who was captured after the defeat of Poland by Germany during World War II, then escaped from a prisoner of war camp and formed the Poland Independent Parachute Brigade.
  - Major Emmanuel Ifeajuna, 32, was executed along with two other officers after being convicted on charges of treason in retreating from Nigerian troops in the Western Region.

== September 26, 1967 (Tuesday) ==
- Dmitri Shostakovich's Second Violin Concerto (and his last concerto of any sort) debuted in Moscow under the direction of Kirill Kondrashin.
- China and Tunisia broke diplomatic relations.

== September 27, 1967 (Wednesday) ==
- All seven people on an Aero Commander 500 shuttle plane were killed when the aircraft crashed into a bike rack outside of Bradfield Elementary School at the Dallas suburb of Highland Park, Texas. Nobody on the ground was injured because classes had been dismissed 20 minutes earlier for a teacher's meeting. On a regular school day, hundreds of children would have been leaving the building at 3:30, when the plane hit. "If this had happened any day but Wednesday", a teacher told reporters, "all of the kids would have been out by the bicycle rack." The pilot, Verner Denman, Jr., apparently made a nose dive into Mockingbird Lane to avoid striking homes. The Dallas County fire marshal praised Denman, saying, "It could have been much worse if he had hit some of these houses here, or the middle of the school" (where a teacher's meeting was taking place, 50 feet (15 m) from the crash site), and added, "I think he knew he was going to die and said 'well, let's end it the best way.'"
- The RMS Queen Mary arrived in Southampton at the end of her last transatlantic crossing. The ship had departed Southampton on September 16 for New York, arriving on September 21; it departed the next day back to Southampton with a sendoff ceremony marked by thousands of people cheering and waving from the Cunard Line pier and the 55-man U.S. Merchant Marine regimental band performing.
- The Soviet Union's first attempt to send a lunar probe in orbit around the Moon failed during the launch of the Soyuz 7K-L1, due to human error. Because engineers at the launchpad had failed to remove a cover, one of the six engines on the Proton rocket failed to ignite and the rocket and its payload went off course. The rocket was destroyed by ground control 97 seconds after launch.
- Canada broke with the United States for the first time over Vietnam War policy, as External Affairs Minister Paul Martin addressed the United Nations General Assembly, suggesting that the U.S. make an unconditional halt to the bombing of North Vietnam. "All attempts to bring about talks between the two sides", Martin said, "are doomed to failure unless the bombing is stopped."
- In Belgrade, the International Astronautical Congress held the first meeting of the CETI (Communication with extraterrestrial intelligence) Organizing Committee, composed of ten delegates from the United States, the United Kingdom, the Soviet Union, Poland, Czechoslovakia, and Sweden.
- Died: Felix Yusupov, 80, Russian aristocrat who participated in the 1916 assassination of Grigori Rasputin

== September 28, 1967 (Thursday) ==
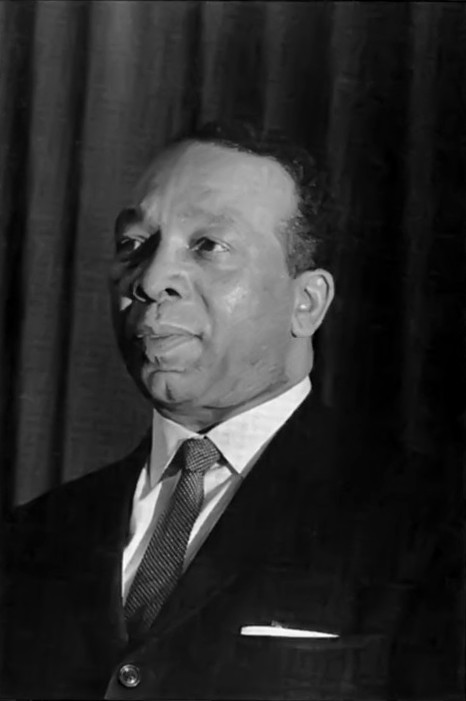
Washington, Mayor of Washington

- Walter E. Washington was sworn in as the first Mayor of Washington, D.C. in a ceremony at the White House. President Johnson used the occasion to announce the nominations of the nine members of the first Washington, D.C. city council, five of whom were African-American and four of whom were white.
- At a meeting in New York City of the National Conference of Catholic Bishops, Archbishop of Detroit John F. Dearden announced that all-English language masses would begin in American churches on October 22, six weeks earlier than had originally been planned.
- Born:
  - Mira Sorvino, American actress, Academy Award winner and daughter of actor Paul Sorvino; in New York City
  - Moon Zappa, American actress and daughter of singer Frank Zappa; in New York City
- Died: Lt. Col. Untung Syamsuri, 41, Indonesian Army officer who had commanded the Palace Guard for President Sukarno until his 1965 attempt to overthrow the government, was executed by a firing squad.

== September 29, 1967 (Friday) ==
- Speaking in Texas in San Antonio to the National Legislative Conference, U.S. President Johnson told his audience, "I am ready to talk tomorrow with Ho Chi Minh and other chiefs of state" to discuss an ending to the Vietnam War, but added that an immediate halt to bombing would happen only if he believed that it would "lead promptly to productive discussion", and that "It is by Hanoi's choice— not ours, not the world's— that war continues." Earlier in the speech, Johnson gave his reasons for a continued fight: "I cannot tell you— with certainty— that a southeast Asia dominated by communist power would bring a third world war closer to terrible reality", he said, "But all that we have learned in this tragic century strongly suggests that it would be so. As the President of the United States, I am not prepared to gamble on the chance that it is not so... I am convinced that by seeing this struggle through now, in Vietnam, we are reducing the chances of a larger war— perhaps a nuclear war." The North Vietnamese government would subsequently reject what would be referred to as "The San Antonio Formula" for peace.
- In an outdoor professional boxing bout at Shea Stadium, Emile Griffith of the United States recaptured the title that he had lost to Nino Benvenuti on April 17. Griffith would lose the title back to Benvenuti on March 4.
- The classic sci-fi TV series Captain Scarlet and the Mysterons was broadcast for the first time, on ITV.
- Thomas W. Morgan, USAF, was designated Apollo Applications Program (AAP) Manager at Kennedy Space Center (KSC), succeeding Robert C. Hock, who had been Acting Manager since January 10.
- Died: Carson McCullers (pen name for Lula Carson Smith McCullers), 50, American novelist and playwright, died 47 days after she was stricken with a brain hemorrhage.

== September 30, 1967 (Saturday) ==
- In the United Kingdom, BBC Radio completely restructured its national programming, with the inauguration of four new networks. Radio 1, introduced by its first disc jockey, Tony Blackburn, modeled its pop music format on successful pirate radio stations. Radio 2 featured music formerly heard on the Light Programme. Radio 3 adopted the cultural format formerly heard on the Third Programme. Finally, Radio 4 followed the talk radio and news format formerly heard on the Home Service.
- The Chinese Communist Party announced a new campaign against "renegades", "capitalist roaders", and "agents of foreign imperialism". The anti-foreigner campaign would reach the point where non-Chinese could be charged with espionage if they photographed posters or bought Red Guard publications.
- Died: Hannah Milhous Nixon, 82, mother of former Vice-President and future U.S. President Richard M. Nixon
