= August 1967 =

Month of 1967

<<	August 1967					>>
Su	Mo	Tu	We	Th	Fr	Sa
		1	2	3	4	5
6	7	8	9	10	11	12
13	14	15	16	17	18	19
20	21	22	23	24	25	26
27	28	29	30	31

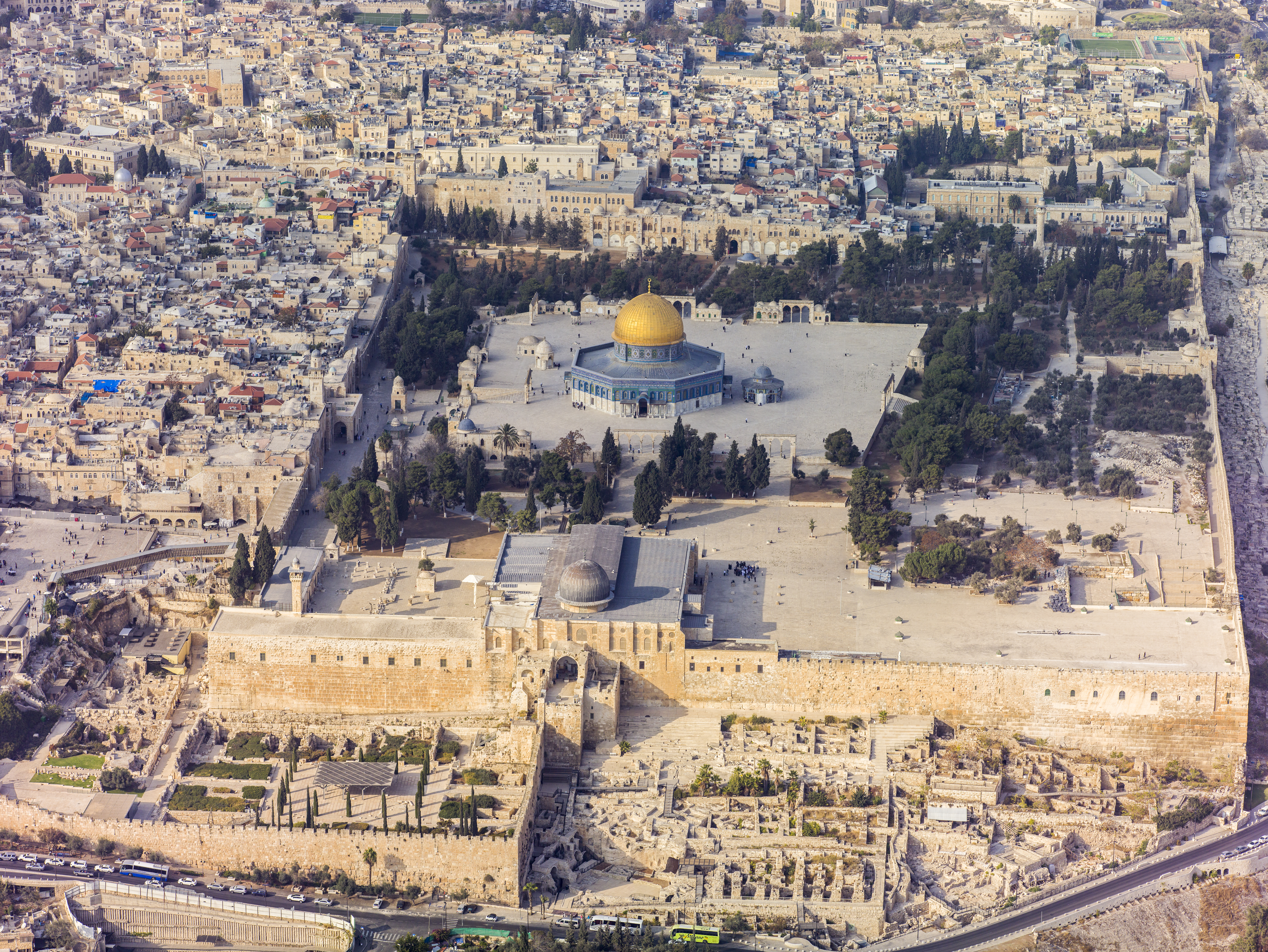
August 16, 1967: Israel's Religion Ministry reaffirms Islamic administration of the Temple Mount

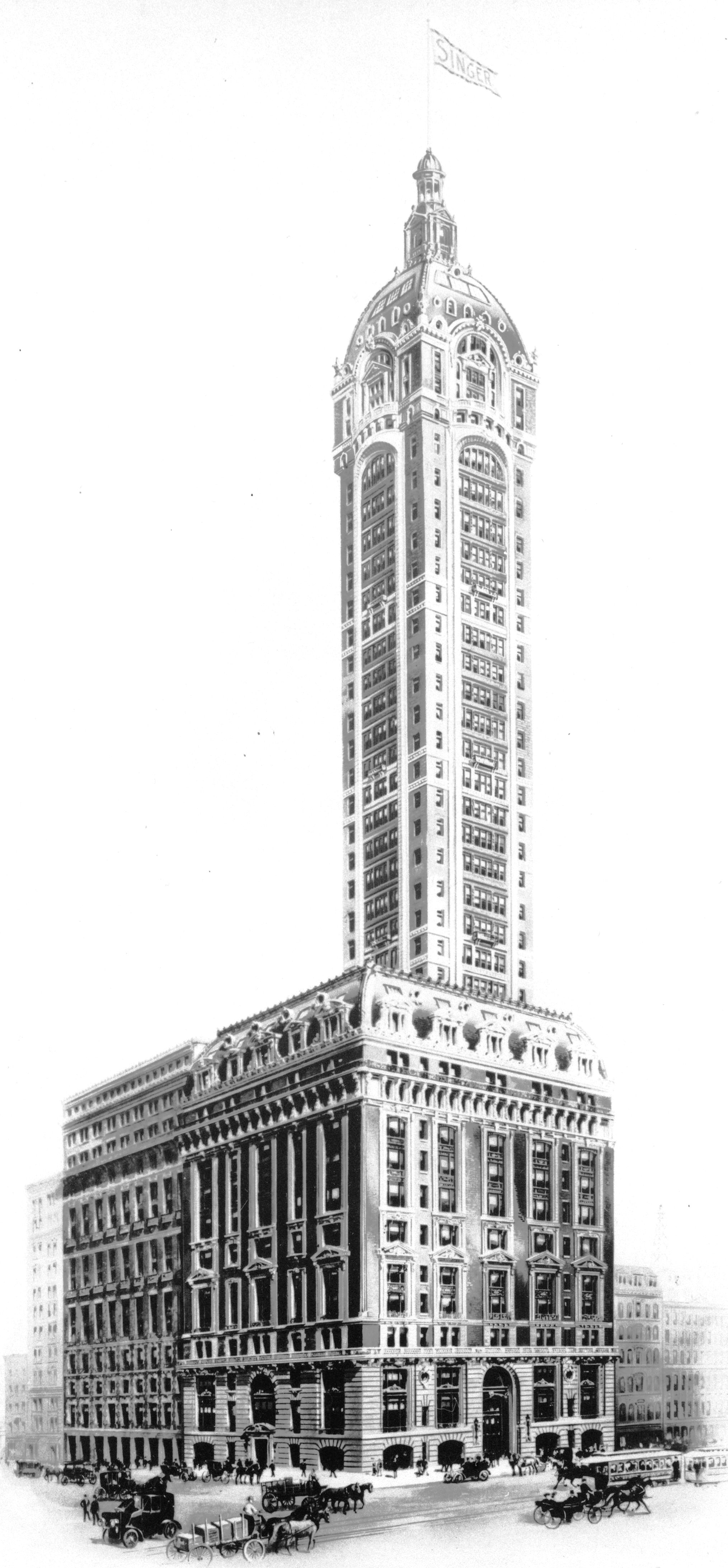
August 22, 1967: The Singer Building, formerly the world's tallest, set to be demolished

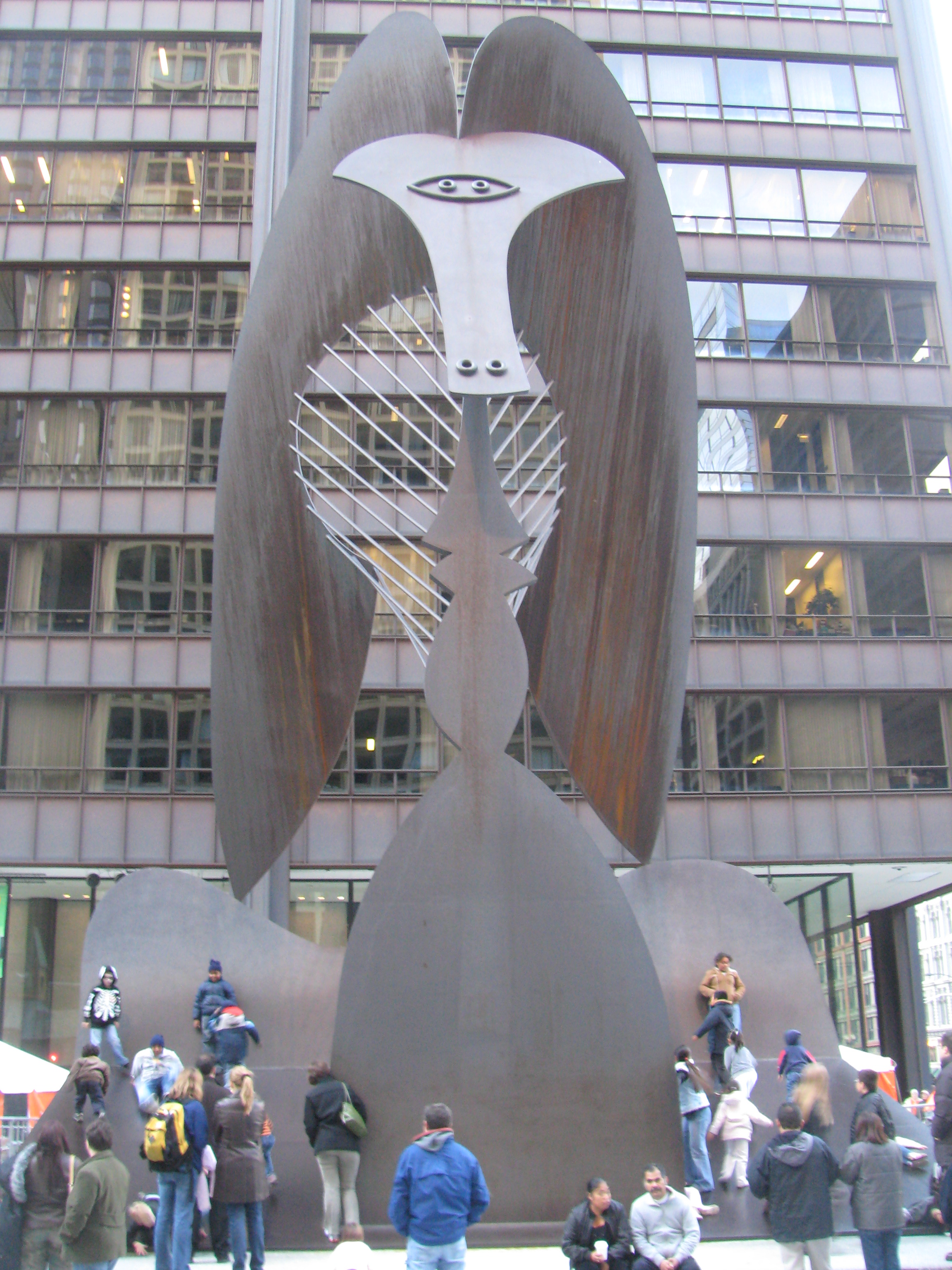
August 15, 1967: Chicago's Picasso statue unveiled

The following events occurred in August 1967:

== August 1, 1967 (Tuesday) ==
- Nine Japanese high school students were killed by a bolt of lightning that struck them while they were descending Mount Nishihodaka, a 9,514 feet (2,900 m) peak in Japan's Hida Mountains, near Nagano. Ten others were injured, and the other 31 members of the group were unhurt.
- The U.S. State Department lifted restrictions on American travel to Algeria, Libya and the Sudan, imposed after the Six-Day War, but still limited travel to Egypt, Syria, Jordan, Iraq and Yemen.
- After its construction at the Pullman Company yards in Chicago, the UAC TurboTrain was sent eastward at regular speed and without passengers, to Providence, Rhode Island in order for UAC Aircraft Systems engineers to tear it down, study it for further development, and then do eventual high-speed testing on a specially-built track between Trenton and New Brunswick, New Jersey.

== August 2, 1967 (Wednesday) ==
- The Turkish soccer football team Trabzonspor, which would become one of the "big four" teams that have won all but one of the championships in Turkey's top national circuit the Süper Lig, played its first game, after having been created by the merger of six teams in the city of Trabzon. Trabonzpor would win six Süper Lig titles in the nine seasons between 1975–76 and 1983–84. The other teams in the "big four" (Galatasaray, Fenerbahçe and Beşiktaş) are all in Istanbul.
- Israel issued IDF Order Number 82, canceling municipal council elections that had been scheduled in the Palestinian towns of the West Bank prior to its capture from Jordan. The four-year terms of all of the members who had been elected in 1963 were extended indefinitely. Elections would finally be held on March 28, 1972, in the cities of Nablus, Jenin, Tulkarm, Qalqilya and Jericho (Ariha); and in Ramallah, Bethlehem and Hebron on May 2, 1972.
- NASA terminated hardware and software procurement for the lunar mapping and survey system, a search for scientifically interesting areas of the Moon that would also be safe for landing, as well as development and testing,
- Died: Walter Terence Stace, 80, British philosopher and mystic

== August 3, 1967 (Thursday) ==
- Thieves stole several priceless artifacts from the Church of the Holy Sepulchre in Jerusalem, taking the "Gold Crown of the Madonna" from a statue of the Virgin Mary and six solid gold hearts. The crown had been presented to the church in 1624 by Elisabeth, Queen Consort of Spain and Portugal. Police recovered the stolen artifacts 11 days later in Tel Aviv, intact, after several men were arrested.
- U.S. President Johnson asked Congress to temporarily increase individual and corporate income taxes by 10 percent for the 1968 tax year. He also announced that he had approved sending an additional 45,000 American troops to fight in the Vietnam War before June 30, 1968, bringing the total number of U.S. personnel in South Vietnam to more than half a million.
- Born:
  - Creme Puff, American cat that holds the record for its longevity (d. 2005); in Austin, Texas
  - Skin (stage name for Deborah Ann Dyer), British rock musician; in Brixton

== August 4, 1967 (Friday) ==
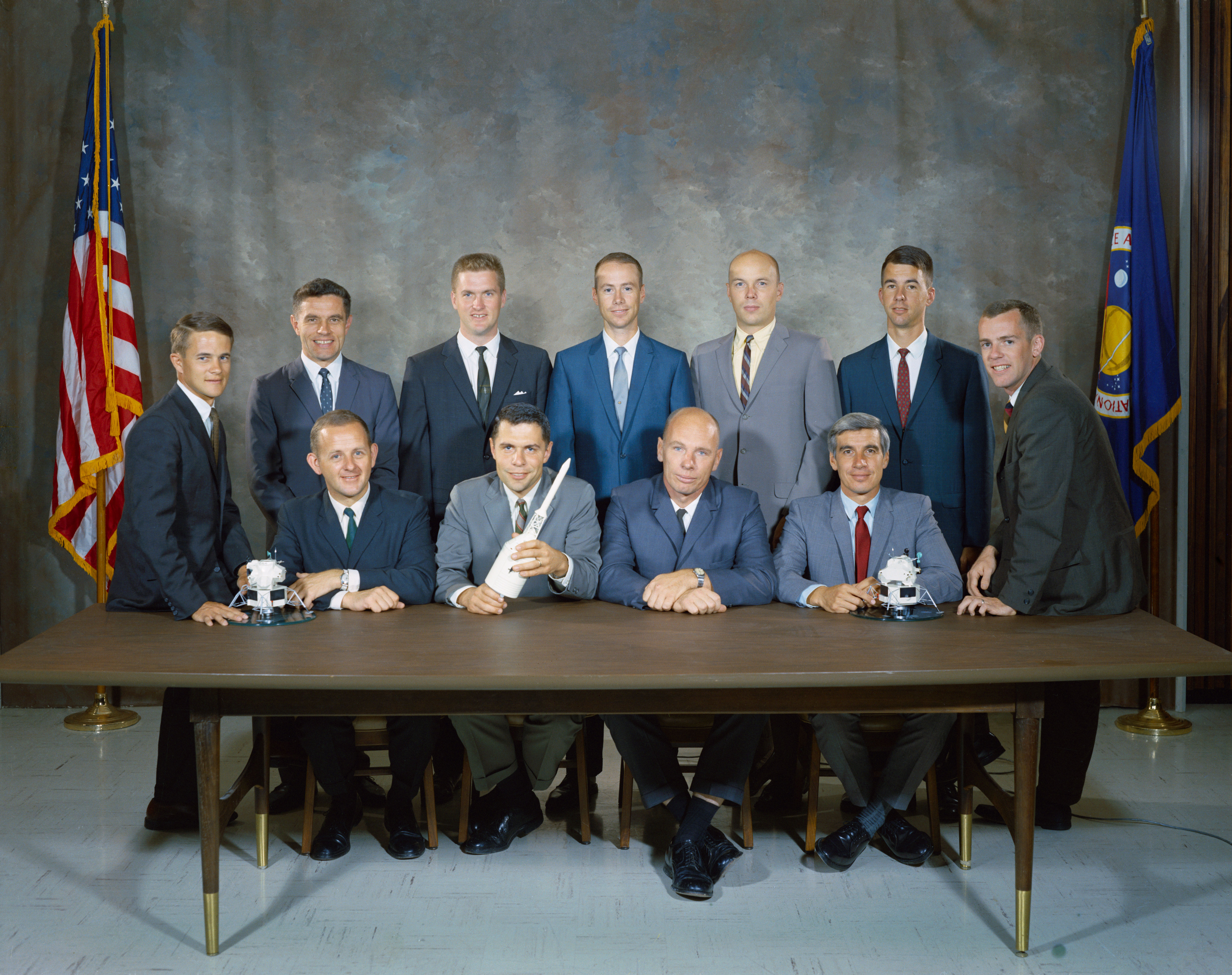
NASA Astronaut Group 6

- NASA named its sixth group of astronauts, with 11 men, seven of whom would be launched on American space shuttle missions. Joseph P. Allen and William B. Lenoir would be the first to go into space, on board the fifth space shuttle mission on the Columbia 15 years later, on November 11, 1982. Story Musgrave would be sent on six shuttle spaceflights between 1983 and 1996, starting with STS-6. The other four would be William E. Thornton (STS-8), Robert A. Parker (STS-9), Anthony W. England and Karl Gordon Henize, both on STS-51-F.
- "The biggest riot in Shanghai" took place after municipal party activist Wang Hongwen called on citizens to attack the Shanghai Diesel Engine Plant on the grounds that its employees and managers were foes of Zhang Chunqiao and the Shanghai Municipal Party Committee. According to one account, a crowd of 100,000 people surrounded the diesel engine factory, and 600 workers inside were taken out forcibly and tortured. Film of the attack would be shown at the Gang of Four trial of the two men (and the two other accused gang members, Jiang Qin and Yao Wenyuan) in 1980.
- The Defence Amendment Act, 1967 went into effect in South Africa, providing that every young, able-bodied white South African male was subject to military training and service with the South African Defence Force (SADF). The only persons exempt were policemen, railroad or prison workers, or enlisted servicemen. The new law also prohibited the media from releasing, without government permission, information about the SADF or its operations, and any "information that would damage South Africa's foreign relations".
- The rock band Pink Floyd released their debut album, The Piper at the Gates of Dawn, in the United Kingdom.
- Born: Mike Marsh, American sprinter, 1991 world champion 200 meter racer and 1992 Olympic gold medalist; in Los Angeles
- Died: Sir Stewart Gore-Browne, 84, white Zambian independence advocate and adviser to Zambian President Kenneth Kaunda

== August 5, 1967 (Saturday) ==
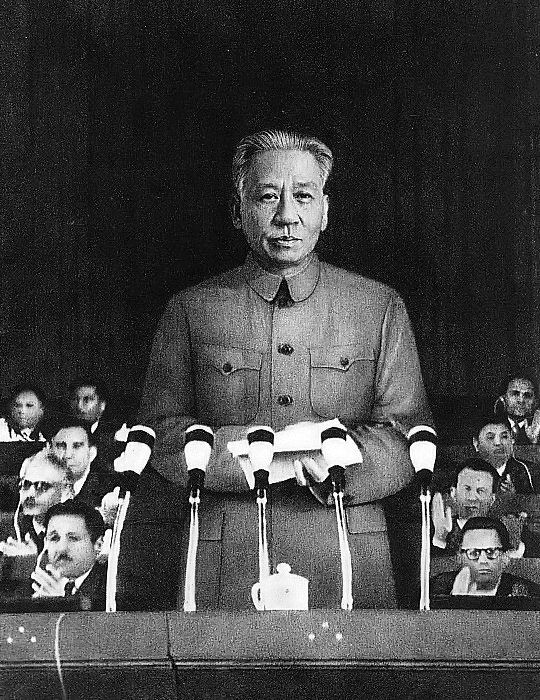
Liu Shaoqi

- China's President Liu Shaoqi and his wife, Wang Guangmei, were put on trial at the Zhongnanhai, the governmental residence center for Chinese officials, after they both fell into disfavor with Communist Party Chairman Mao Zedong. With photographers and a film crew present, President Liu and Wang were beaten and kicked after being ridiculed by party members. Kept under arrest, and starved and deprived of medication, Liu would die two years later, while his wife would be incarcerated at Qincheng Prison for the next 12 years.
- Poisoning killed 137 people at a new moon festival in Madras after they had ingested drinking a cocktail of lime juice and varnish. The deadly substitute for alcohol was made because of a prohibition in Madras state against the sale of liquor. C. N. Annadurai, the Chief Minister of the Madras State in India (now the state of Tamil Nadu), declined to push for a repeal of prohibition and said instead that the sale of varnish would be temporarily prohibited.
- The World Boxing Association began a single-elimination tournament to fill the heavyweight boxing title that it had taken away from Muhammad Ali, starting with two quarterfinal bouts at the Houston Astrodome. In the first fight, Thad Spencer beat former WBA champion Ernie Terrell, and in the second card, eventual champion Jimmy Ellis beat Leotis Martin. The other four competitors were Oscar Bonavena and Karl Mildenberger (who would fight on September 16) and Jerry Quarry and Floyd Patterson (who would fight on October 28).
- For the first time, almost all of the teams in the American Football League and the National Football League played against each other, as part of a series of 16 interleague preseason football games. In the opening game, a team from the AFL defeated an NFL team for the first time, as the Denver Broncos upset the Detroit Lions, 13 to 7. All of the AFL teams, and 12 of the 16 from the NFL, played in the series. The exceptions were the Packers (who had played the first NFL–AFL game when they beat the Chiefs in the Super Bowl), the Cardinals, the Giants, and the Browns.
- Born:
  - Fred Whitfield, African-American professional rodeo calf roper and eight-time world champion of the Professional Rodeo Cowboys Association; in Hockley, Texas
  - Reid Hoffman, American internet entrepreneur, billionaire, and co-founder of LinkedIn; in Palo Alto, California
  - Thomas Lang, Austrian-born American metal band drummer; in Vienna

== August 6, 1967 (Sunday) ==
- Graduate student Jocelyn Bell of the University of Cambridge radio telescope observatory became the first person to discover a pulsar, while doing the routine job of analyzing data from the radio receivers. She found "a peculiar train of radio signals" that repeated every 1.33 seconds on the 81.5 megahertz radio frequency when the telescope was viewing a particular section of the sky (within the area occupied by the constellation Vulpecula), and she and Chief Astronomer Antony Hewish were surprised to find the signal appear again at the same time the next day. Confirmation that the regular pulses were coming from the source would take place on November 28. The stellar object would be designated originally as Cambridge Pulsar 1919 (because of its coordinates of 19^{h} 19^{m} right ascension) and would later be referred to as PSR B1919+21.
- Scientists in the Chinese city of Changchun made two tests of conventional explosives that included radioactive materials. The two "radioactive self-defense bombs" were both detonated within city limits, one at 1:15 in the morning and the other at 12:35 in the afternoon. In so doing, they earned "the dubious distinction of having first designed and tested (though— as far as is known— never actually used against human targets) various primitive 'dirty bombs'."
- A nonviolent general strike was called by Palestinian representatives in East Jerusalem to protest Israel's administration of the formerly-Jordanian city, most notably the directive that teachers in the city's schools would have to teach an Israeli-approved curriculum. "We have called a general strike so that the world will hear your outcry," a notice read, "and to prove you are steadfast in your refusal to accept the plans and the laws of the Zionists and that you belong to the Arab nation on both banks of the Jordan. Long live Jordan on both banks, long live Arab Jerusalem." The next day, Palestinian residents refused to show up to work, and the protest leaders announced that they would never accept citizenship in Israel, nor participate in the upcoming municipal elections.
- KMPX of San Francisco became the first radio station in the United States to take advantage of new FCC regulations that dropped a previous requirement of government approval of a change of the music to be played and another restriction of the FM band to classical and "easy-listening". KMPX went to a progressive rock format. The programming on the 106.9 FM frequency began a trend toward FM radio stations making the transition from music to "album rock" music.

== August 7, 1967 (Monday) ==
- Lunar Orbiter 5, launched six days earlier by NASA, transmitted the most clear pictures up to that time of the far side of the Moon, taken from an altitude of 1,660 miles and then processed on the spacecraft and televised back to Earth.
- Died: William Spratling, 66, American silver designer, was killed in an automobile accident in Mexico near his home in Taxco de Alarcón in the state of Guerrero.

== August 8, 1967 (Tuesday) ==
- The Association of Southeast Asian Nations (ASEAN) was founded with the signing of a declaration at the Saranrom Palace in Bangkok, by the Foreign Ministers of Thailand (Thanat Khoman; Indonesia (Adam Malik); Singapore (Sinnathamby Rajaratnam); and the Philippines (Narciso Ramos); and by the Deputy Prime Minister of Malaysia (Tun Abdul Razak). In later years, the five founders would be joined by Brunei in 1984; Vietnam in 1995; Burma and Laos in 1997; and Cambodia in 1999.
- Voters in Duval County, Florida and the city of Jacksonville, Florida overwhelmingly (54,493 to 29,768) approved a merger of the two governments. When the merger took effect on October 1, 1968, Jacksonville became the largest city by area in the U.S. at 874.46 square miles (2,264.8 km^{2}), a figure surpassed on July 1, 1970, by Juneau, Alaska.
- Born:
  - Sable (stage name for Rena Marlette Greek), American actress and professional wrestler; in Jacksonville, Florida
  - Yūki Amami, Japanese actress; in Taitō, Tokyo

== August 9, 1967 (Wednesday) ==
- An army of 100 Belgian mercenaries and 1,500 Congolese army rebels, commanded by former Belgian Army Major Jean Schramme retook control of the city of Bukavu in the eastern Congo, and drove 300 Congolese Army troops into Rwanda to be disarmed. The local population did not support the rebels, and troops sent by Congo's President Mobutu would drive the mercenaries out by the end of November.
- Troops from the breakaway republic of Biafra, formerly the Eastern Region of Nigeria, expanded the Nigerian Civil War by invading the federation's rebellious Western Region and occupied Benin City and the ports of Sapele and Ughelli. The remaining Northern Region and Mid-Western Region were unaffected by the invasion.
- British colonial authorities in Hong Kong closed down three pro-communist newspapers, the Tin Fung Daily News, the Hong Kong Evening News and the Afternoon News, halting publication pending the resolution of lawsuits, and arresting five of the journalists on charges of sedition and the spreading of false or inflammatory reports.
- The city of Denver, Colorado, was shaken by the strongest earthquake ever recorded in that state. Although nobody was injured, the 5.5 magnitude tremor was strong enough to shatter windows and to be felt within a 120-mile (190 km) radius. The previous record had been set on April 10 by a 5.0 magnitude quake.
- In Afghanistan's Kunar Province, 37 people drowned when the bus they were in fell off a 30-foot (9.1 m) cliff and overturned in a river. Only three of the people on board survived.
- Born:
  - Dana Vávrová, Czech film actress who later became a German film director; in Prague (died of cancer, 2009)
  - Deion Sanders, American NFL football cornerback and MLB baseball outfielder; in Fort Myers, Florida
- Died:
  - Joe Orton, 34, English playwright and film screenplay writer, was beaten to death at his Islington home by his lover, Kenneth Halliwell, 41, who then committed suicide with an overdose of sleeping pills.
  - Anton Walbrook, 70, Austrian and German film actor

== August 10, 1967 (Thursday) ==
- Section 127 of the Constitution of Australia, which provided that "In reckoning the numbers of the people of the Commonwealth, or of a State or other part of the Commonwealth, aboriginal natives shall not be counted", was repealed as the Constitution Alteration (Aboriginals) 1967 went into effect, two and a half months after its approval in a referendum on May 27. In addition, a subsection of Section 51, which had noted that "The Parliament shall, subject to this Constitution, have power to make laws for the peace, order, and good government of the Commonwealth with respect to: (xxvi) the people of any race, other than the aboriginal race in any State, for whom it is deemed necessary to make special laws" was amended to remove eight words, and now refers to "(xxxvi) the people of any race for whom it is deemed necessary to make special laws".
- Born: Riddick Bowe, American boxer and world heavyweight champion from 1992 to 1993 after his defeat of Evander Holyfield; in Brooklyn

== August 11, 1967 (Friday) ==
- Red Guards at the port of Dairen in the People's Republic of China attacked and seized control of a Soviet cargo ship, the Svirsk, a few days after the ship's captain was said to have dishonored Chairman Mao Zedong by refusing to accept a welcoming badge bearing the chairman's image. The offending captain was paraded through the streets the next day and the ship was held in port. After Soviet Premier Alexei Kosygin threatened to end all trade with China, the Chinese Navy freed the ship and escorted it out of the port. A day after the Svirsk was allowed to leave, protesters would attack the Soviet Embassy in Beijing.
- The Long Biên Bridge over North Vietnam's Red River, the only link between that nation's two largest cities (Hanoi and Haiphong), was heavily damaged in an airstrike by the 388th Fighter Wing and 355th Fighter Wing of the U.S. Air Force, and its center span was destroyed. Nevertheless, the North Vietnamese would quickly restore their supply lines with "a pontoon bridge, constructed each evening and taken apart each morning", and a repatched bridge would be reopened by October 5.
- William C. Foster, the chief American representative at the 18-nation nuclear disarmament conference in Geneva, announced at the White House that the U.S. and the USSR had agreed in principle on the conditions of a nuclear nonproliferation treaty. The drafts would be submitted on August 24.
- The cause of action in the landmark 1972 case of Furman v. Georgia began during a burglary in Savannah, Georgia when William Henry Furman shot and killed Chief Petty Officer William J. Micke Jr. at Micke's home. Furman would contend that the shooting was accidental, but was found guilty of murder and sentenced to death. Furman, who was black, then appealed the sentence. Based on statistics that the death penalty was applied disproportionately to African-Americans convicted of murder, the U.S. Supreme Court would invalidate all death penalty convictions and laws in the United States on June 29, 1972.
- Born:
  - Joe Rogan, American podcaster, comedian and martial arts commentator; in Newark, New Jersey
  - Collin Chou, Taiwan-born American film actor and martial artist; as Chou Siu-lung in Kaohsiung
  - Enrique Bunbury, Spanish singer-songwriter; in Zaragoza

== August 12, 1967 (Saturday) ==
- Britain's Prices and Incomes Act 1966, passed the previous year as a means of controlling inflation, went into effect in the United Kingdom, giving the British government the authority to delay increases in prices, surcharges, and salaries.
- Born: Emil Kostadinov, Bulgarian soccer football striker with 70 caps for the Bulgaria national team; in Sofia
- Died: Esther Forbes, 76, American writer of biographies and historical novels for young readers, and winner of the Newbery Medal for Johnny Tremain

== August 13, 1967 (Sunday) ==
- The rock band Fleetwood Mac made its debut, appearing at the National Jazz and Blues Festival in Windsor, Berkshire, with Peter Green, Mick Fleetwood, Jeremy Spencer and (instead of John McVie), bassist Bob Brunning.
- Two women were killed by bears, in separate attacks on the same night, while camping at the Glacier National Park in Montana. The unusual incidents, the first bear attacks in the history of the park, would call national attention to both the dangers of leaving garbage out in the open and the problems associated with the decreasing size of wild habitats and the increasing number of people encroaching upon them. At 12:45, summertime park employees Julie Helgesen and Roy Ducat were in sleeping bags when they were mauled by a bear that had apparently been attracted by leftover sandwiches; Hegelsen was dragged away and died hours later. Twenty miles away, Michele Koons, a 19-year-old camper from San Diego, was camping with four fellow employees at the park and was unable to get out of her sleeping bag before a different bear dragged her away and killed her. The tragedy would later become the basis for a bestselling book, Night of the Grizzlies by Jack Olsen.
- The Nigerian Air Force, which would later become one of the largest in Africa, received its first combat aircraft, with the arrival of several MiG-17 jet fighters from the Soviet Union, initially flown by pilots from Egypt.
- The head-on collision of two passengers buses near the Iranian city of Ayask killed 40 people and seriously injured 33 more.
- Born: Scott Kirby, American airline executive currently who became the CEO of United Airlines in 2020
- Died: Jane Darwell, 87, American stage, film and television actress, and Academy Award winner for Best Supporting Actress in 1940 for The Grapes of Wrath.

== August 14, 1967 (Monday) ==
- All but one of the United Kingdom's pirate radio stations played music for their final day, then signed off before the new Marine Broadcasting Offences Act 1967 went into effect at midnight. The new law was an extension of the Wireless Telegraphy Act 1949 and although it could not prohibit boats from broadcasting from outside Britain's territorial waters, it did prohibit those stations from selling advertising within the British Isles. Only one station, Radio Caroline, would continue to broadcast the next day. With the shutdown of the pirate stations, BBC Radio 1 would go on the air on September 30 with a popular music format.
- Pál Losonczi took office as the Chairman of the Presidential Council of Hungary, succeeding István Dobi in the ceremonial role as the Eastern European nation's official head of state. Prime Minister Jenő Fock would remain the head of government, and the de facto leader of Hungary would continue to be the General Secretary of the Hungarian Socialist Workers' Party, János Kádár. Losonczi would serve for nearly 20 years, until June 25, 1987.
- Nine Brazilian Navy sailors and two officers on the battle cruiser Barroso were scalded to death by superheated steam when a pipe to the ship's turbines ruptured during maintenance.

== August 15, 1967 (Tuesday) ==
- In India, 27 people fell to their deaths when they struck a tree branch while riding on top of a passenger train as it passed through the city of Katihar in Bihar state. The limb was from a banyan tree that was considered sacred by worshipers of the Hindu goddess Kali and was part of a shrine. For several weeks, nobody would trim the branch until the railroad company offered a job to anyone who was willing to cut it down. Finally, an enterprising resident named Siaram Jha defied the goddess of destruction and sawed off the limb.
- The Shell Lake murders took place, with nine members of a family near Shell Lake, Saskatchewan, shot to death. Victor Ernest Hoffman broke into the home of James Peterson, then used a repeater rifle to shoot Mr. and Mrs. Peterson and seven of their eight children, who ranged in age from two years old to 17 years old. The only survivor of the massacre was a four-year-old girl.
- The Chicago Picasso, a 50-foot (15 m) high metal Cubist sculpture created by Pablo Picasso, was unveiled in front of the Chicago Civic Center (now the Richard J. Daley Center).
- Born: Brahim Boutayeb, Moroccan athlete and 1988 Olympic gold medalist, in the 10,000 metre race; in Khemisset
- Died:
  - Manuel Prado Ugarteche, 78, President of Peru from 1939 to 1945 and 1956 to 1962
  - René Magritte, 68, Belgian surrealist painter

== August 16, 1967 (Wednesday) ==
- Access to the Temple Mount, venerated as a holy site in Judaism, Christianity and Islam, was placed fully under the control of the Jerusalem Islamic Waqf by Israel's Ministry of Religion. The action came the day after the Israeli Defense Forces' Chief Rabbi, Major General Shlomo Goren had led a group of soldiers in prayer at the site and declared his intention to build a synagogue on the mount, overlooking Old Jerusalem and recently captured from Jordan during the Six-Day War. The civilian Israel Police would continue to guard the site, and to ban prayer there by non-Muslims, half a century later.
- Born:
  - Pamela Smart, American murderer; as Pamela Ann Wojas in Coral Gables, Florida
  - Ulrika Jonsson, Swedish-born British television host; in Sollentuna
- Died: H. H. Kung (Kung Hsiang-hsi), 85, Prime Minister of the Republic of China (from 1938 to 1939)

== August 17, 1967 (Thursday) ==
- Demonstrators in Beijing forced their way into the Soviet Union's embassy compound in China, smashed windows in the main building, destroyed furniture and set fire to files. A similar attack would take place on the British diplomatic quarters the following week.

== August 18, 1967 (Friday) ==
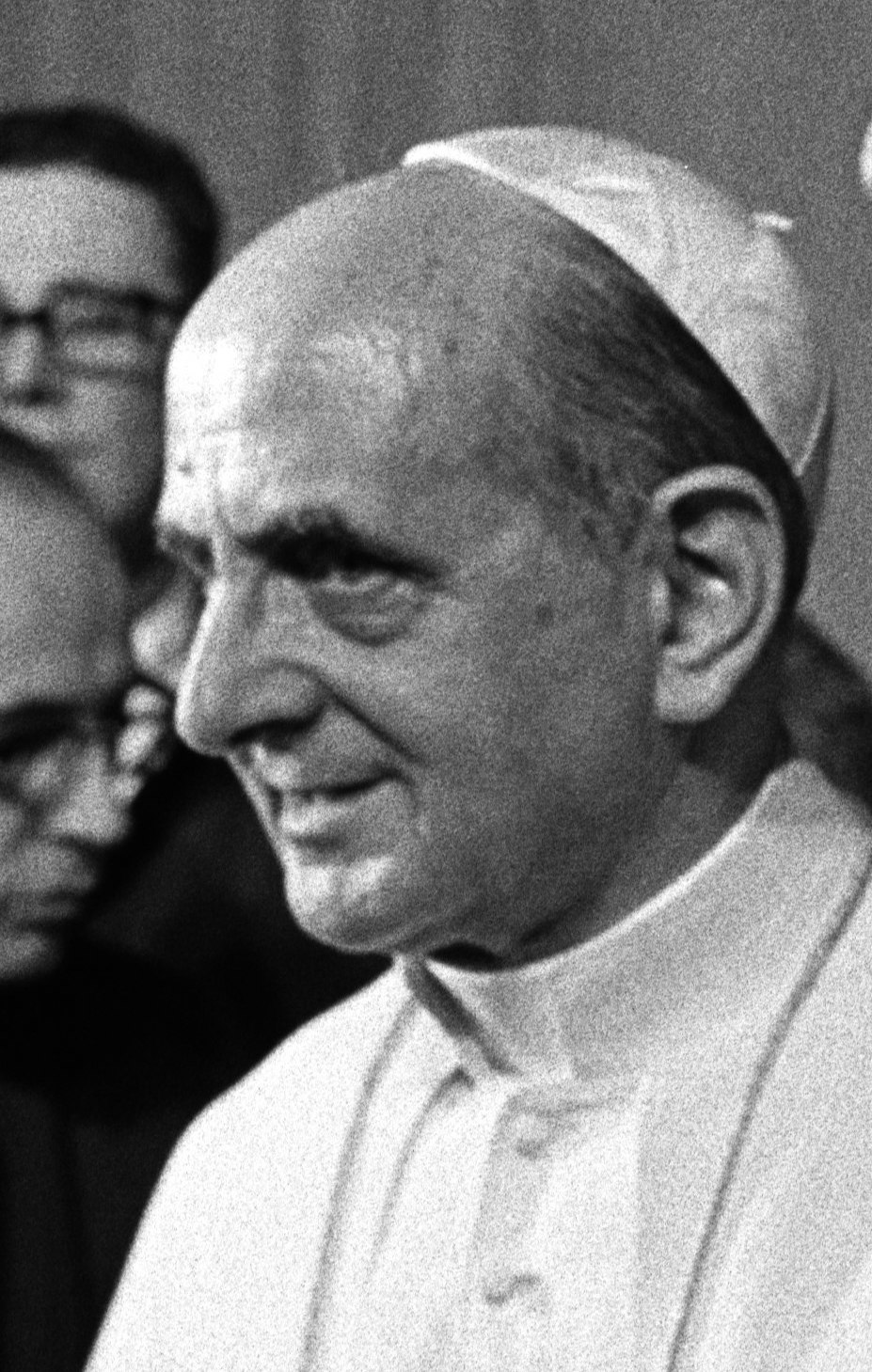
Pope Paul VI

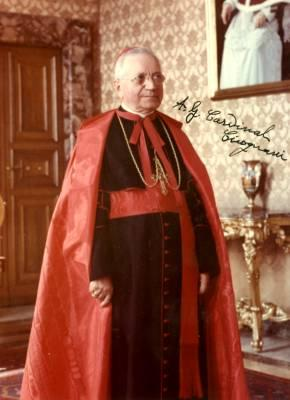
Secretary Cicognani

- Pope Paul VI announced a drastic reform of the governance of the Roman Catholic Church and of Vatican City. The Roman Curia was reorganized "into something similar to a modern government cabinet". The Pope's Secretary of State, Cardinal Amleto Cicognani, was given expanded powers and the title of "papal secretary", with expanded powers analogous to those of a Prime Minister. For the first time, an annual budget was to be drawn up, under a new office to be known as the "Prefecture of Economic Affairs of the Holy See".
- Boston Red Sox outfielder Tony Conigliaro suffered a severe head injury after being struck in the left temple by a baseball thrown by pitcher Jack Hamilton of the visiting California Angels. "Tony C.", who had led the American League in home runs in 1965, sustained damage to his left eye and would miss the rest of 1967 and all of the 1968 season, before making a comeback in 1969 and hitting 20 home runs. Conigliaro's injury "encouraged the use of the batting helmet with the addition of the earflap", which would become mandatory in Major League Baseball by 1983.
- Nine days after the Biafran Army had captured much of the Nigeria's Western Region, Biafran troops from the Edo tribe rebelled against their Igbo officers and declared the first Republic of Benin (with Albert Okonkwo as president), independent of both Nigeria and Biafra. The republic, not affiliated with Dahomey (which now calls itself the Republic of Benin), would exist for a little more than a month, before the retaking of Benin City by Nigerian troops.
- Israel opened its border crossing at the Allenby Bridge of the Jordan River and began the first of 14 days during which repatriation would be allowed for the 167,500 Palestinian refugees who had applied to return to their homes in the West Bank. On the first day, only 355 displaced people, most of them women and children, or elderly residents, came across the border. Both Israel and Jordan blamed each other for the small number of crossings.
- Born: Daler Mehndi, Indian recording artist known for popularizing Bhangra music; in Patna, Bihar state

== August 19, 1967 (Saturday) ==
- NASA published "the first extensive chart of the hidden side of the Moon ever to be compiled", in advance of the August 22 meeting of the International Astronomical Union in Prague. Most of the features were unlabeled, but the map did use two names that had been proposed by the Soviet Union for features identified when the USSR took the far side's first pictures in 1959, Mare Moscoviense and the crater Tsiolkovsky. Two other features had been named by astronomers who had seen portions of the fringe of the far side through telescopes, the Mare Orientale (described by German astronomer Julius Franz in 1906) and the Jules Verne crater.
- Oliver Tambo, the acting president of the African National Congress, and James Chikerema, vice-president of the Zimbabwe African People's Union, announced a military alliance between the ANC and ZAPU, which were fighting the white minority regimes in South Africa and Rhodesia, respectively.
- Born: Satya Nadella, Indian-born American business executive and CEO of Microsoft since 2014 and chairman of the board since 2021; in Hyderabad, Andhra Pradesh state
- Died:
  - Hugo Gernsback, 83, Luxembourg-born American science fiction publisher, for whom the Hugo Award is named
  - Isaac Deutscher, 60, Austro-Hungarian born British historian

== August 20, 1967 (Sunday) ==
- In Guerrero state police officers in Mexico opened fire on a crowd of unarmed protesters as they approached the Acapulco headquarters of the Regional Union of Copra Producers (URPC) to confront their union leader, killing at least 23 people and perhaps as many as 40.
- In Beijing, China's Foreign Ministry delivered a 48-hour ultimatum to the British Chargé d'affaires Office demanding that British authorities in Hong Kong cancel its suspension of publication of the three communist newspapers that had been closed on August 9; release the five men who had been arrested and declare them innocent of any crimes; and to drop any civil suits against the papers. When the ultimatum expired, members of the Red Guards attacked the diplomatic office.
- Three men in a car strafed the U.S. Embassy in London with machine gun fire, shattering glass doors and windows, but causing no injuries because the attack was timed for 11:30 at night. A note, signed by a group calling itself the Revolutionary Solidarity Committee, contained the warning "Stop: Criminal murders by the American army. Solidarity with all people battling against Yankee fascism all over the world! Racism! Freedom for American Negroes!"

== August 21, 1967 (Monday) ==
- Two U.S. Navy A-6A Intruder jets were shot down over the People's Republic of China after straying into Chinese airspace while attempting an attack on North Vietnam. A U.S. Defense Department spokesman said that the two planes were part of a group from the aircraft carrier USS Constellation while on a bombing run of the Duc Noi railroad yard northeast of Hanoi, and conceded that they had inadvertently crossed into Chinese territory. Radio Peking announced that it had captured one of the men alive. U.S. Navy Lt. Robert J. Flynn would remain in a Chinese prison camp until March 15, 1973.
- Born:
  - Serj Tankian, Lebanese-born Armenian-American songwriter and lead singer of the heavy metal band System of a Down; in Beirut
  - Carrie-Anne Moss, Canadian film actress; in Burnaby, British Columbia

== August 22, 1967 (Tuesday) ==
- Members of China's Red Guards invaded the United Kingdom's diplomatic compound in Beijing, setting fire to the chancery and beating Donald Hopson, the British chargé d'affaires and the highest-ranking British diplomat in Communist China. The attack followed the expiration time of an ultimatum from the Chinese government to Hopson demanding that Britain rescind the closure of three leftist newspapers in Hong Kong. The next day, the diplomats and their families were allowed to leave and find refuge in other embassies and legations. Because the attack had come despite a directive from Prime Minister Zhou Enlai forbidding violence against diplomatic establishments, Party Chairman Mao Zedong would order the arrest of the instigators of the violence, Wang Li and Guan Feng. Zhou would apologize to the British government on behalf of China, and the Chinese government would rebuild the offices that had been burned.
- Modibo Keïta, the President of Mali, launched a révolution culturelle in his West African nation, reviving the Comité national de défense de la révolution (CNDR, the National Committee for Defense of the Revolution) and authorized it to purge the military and the civil service. The People's Militia would carry out the arrest and torture of thousands of Malians. Keïta himself would be overthrown on November 19, 1968, and would be executed in prison on May 16, 1977.
- Officials in New York City announced that the 47-story Singer Building, which had briefly been the tallest building in the world in 1908 and 1909, would be torn down.
- Born:
  - Ty Burrell, American television, stage and film actor known for portraying Phil Dunphy on Modern Family; in Grants Pass, Oregon
  - Layne Staley, American rock musician and guitarist for Alice in Chains; in Kirkland, Washington (died of drug overdose, 2002)
  - Yukiko Okada, Japanese female singer known as Yukko; in Ichinomiya (committed suicide, 1986)
  - Adewale Akinnuoye-Agbaje, British film actor; in Islington
- Died: Dr. Gregory Pincus, 64, American biochemist and co-inventor of the first birth control pill

== August 23, 1967 (Wednesday) ==
- The Anglican Church of Canada relaxed its strict ban against the remarriage of its divorced members, in an overwhelming amendment of canon law by delegates to the General Synod in Ottawa. Previously, a Canadian Anglican who had gotten a divorce was subject to excommunication if he or she remarried while the former spouse was still alive. Archbishop H. H. Clark, Primate of All Canada, said that he believed that the reform would encourage Parliament "to move with greater speed" in reforming Canada's divorce laws without fear of Church opposition.
- The Republic of the Congo was reorganized into nine administrative regions for purposes of representation in the National Assembly. Kouilou and the Pool Region would have 17 representatives each, Bouenza 13, Niari 12, Cuvette and Plateaux 10 each, Lékoumou 5, and Sangha and Likouala 3 each; the cities of Brazzaville and Pointe-Noire were separate constituencies.

== August 24, 1967 (Thursday) ==
- The United States Army began issuing the standard "Army Green shade 44" wool gabardine trench coat to be worn by all members. The new garment replaced the system of olive green overcoats for enlisted personnel and taupe colored overcoats for officers and warrant officers.
- At a meeting of the UN's Eighteen Nation Committee on Disarmament, the United States and the Soviet Union submitted "two separate but identically worded draft treaties" that would form the basis for the Treaty on the Non-Proliferation of Nuclear Weapons.
- Born: Shelley Beattie, American female professional bodybuilder who overcame profound hearing loss to become a Ms. Olympia competitor and a regular (as "Siren") on American Gladiators; in Santa Ana, California (committed suicide, 2008)
- Died: Henry J. Kaiser, 85, American industrialist and founder of Kaiser Shipyards, Kaiser Aluminum, Kaiser Steel, Kaiser Permanente health care, Kaiser-Frazer automobile company and Kaiser Motors, as well as the Kaiser Family Foundation.

== August 25, 1967 (Friday) ==
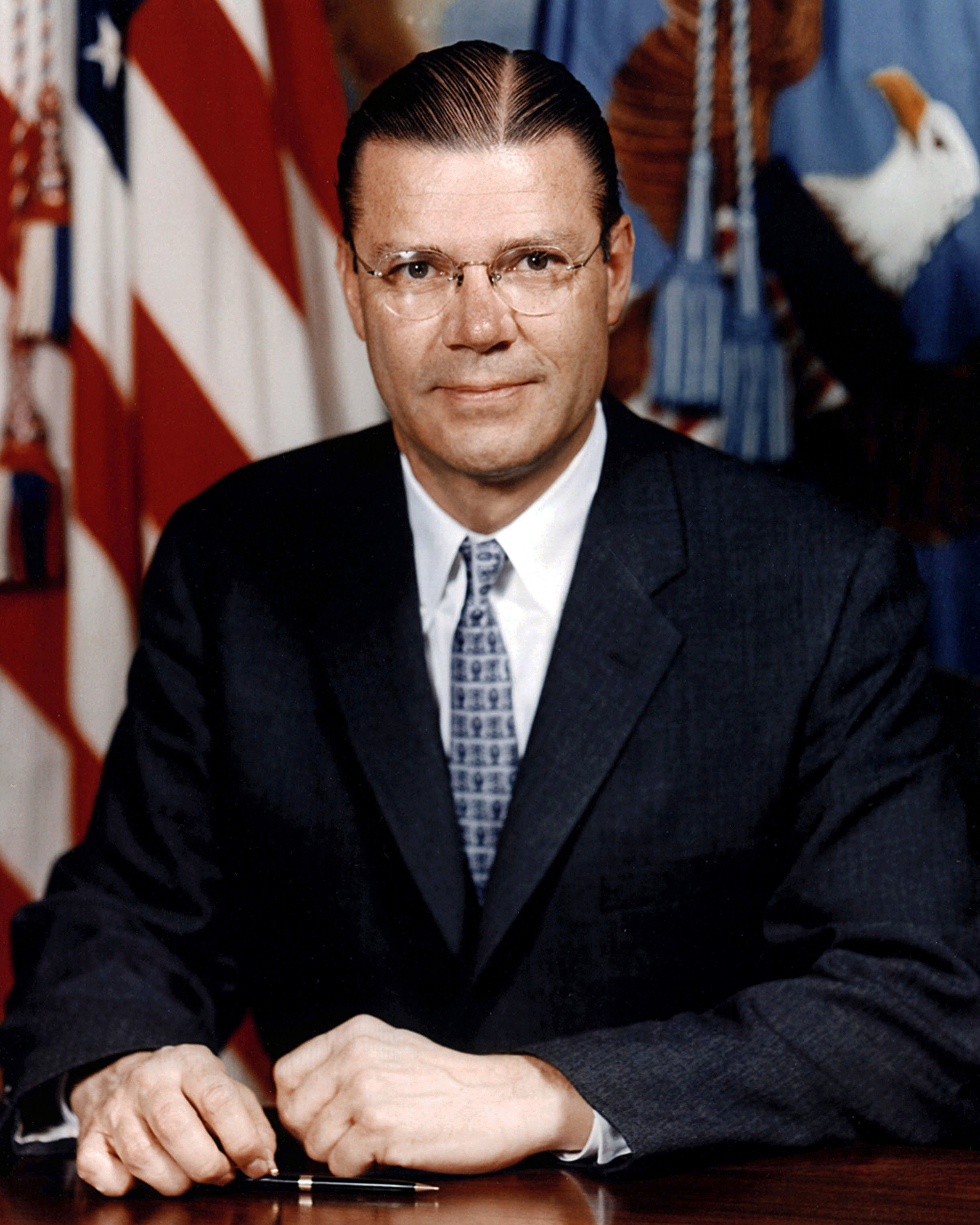
Secretary McNamara

- U.S. Secretary of Defense Robert S. McNamara testified before a U.S. Senate subcommittee that the bombing of North Vietnam, the policy advocated by the Joint Chiefs of Staff, would not bring about peace negotiations and that "enemy operations in the south cannot, on the basis of reports I have seen, be stopped by air bombardment". According to a 1989 book by historian Mark Perry, the JCS Chief of Staff, General Earle Wheeler, called an emergency meeting of the chiefs of staff and the group decided that they should call a press conference for August 26 to announce their resignations, the military leaders reversed themselves the next day because it would give the appearance of a mutiny. On the other hand, General Wheeler would publicly dismiss Perry's account as untrue.
- Field Marshal Abdel Hakim Amer, who had commanded the armed forces of Egypt during the Six-Day War and was fired after the defeat by Israel, was arrested along with 50 other senior officers and civilians and charged with plotting to overthrow President Nasser. Marshal Amer would die on September 14 while under house arrest, in what was reported to be a suicide. Shams Badran, who had been dismissed as Defense Minister in the aftermath of the war, would be arrested later and, like Marshal Amer, charged with "attempting to stage a military comeback" in the recovery of his former job.
- The South American nation of Paraguay promulgated a new Constitution that restored the bicameral legislature that had existed prior to 1940, when the Senate of Paraguay had been abolished. The Senate became the upper chamber of the new National Congress, while the existing Chamber of Representatives was renamed the Chamber of Deputies. The new Constitution also granted official recognition, for the first time, to the Guarani language, joining Spanish as a national language.
- In the Huánuco Region of Peru, 38 people were killed and 28 injured while riding in the back of a freight truck that was serving as a bus. The crowded truck was about 22 miles (35 km) away from its destination of Cerro de Pasco when it failed to round a steep mountain curve and plunged down a 460-foot (140 m) embankment.
- West Germany became only the fourth nation in the world to have color television broadcasting (after the U.S., Canada and the UK). Foreign Minister and future Chancellor Willy Brandt pressed a button to inaugurate the network service at the 25th annual Great German Expedition.
- Representatives of the United Kingdom and the Soviet Union signed an agreement to establish a hotline between the two nations.
- The government of Israel opened the Golan Heights, captured nearly three months earlier from Syria, to civilian settlers.
- Born: Dr. Eckart von Hirschhausen, German physician and comedian; in Frankfurt
- Died:
  - George Lincoln Rockwell, 49, "Fuehrer" of the American Nazi Party, was shot and killed by a sniper while leaving the Dominion Hills Shopping Center at 6015 Wilson Boulevard in Arlington, Virginia, near the party's headquarters. Rockwell had gone to the Econowash, a coin-operated laundry, and was backing his 1958 Chevrolet out of a parking space when two bullets came through the windshield and struck him in the chest. The sniper was John Patler, whom Rockwell had fired a few months earlier. Patler would be convicted of the murder in December and would be sentenced to 20 years in prison, but would be paroled in 1975.
  - Lam Bun, 37, Hong Kong radio commentator, died two days after being set on fire in his car by leftist demonstrators whom he had criticized during the Hong Kong riots.
  - Paul Muni (stage name for Friederich Weisenfreund), 71, Austro-Hungarian born American stage and film actor, winner of the Tony Award for Best Actor in 1955 for Inherit the Wind
  - Stanley Bruce, 84, Prime Minister of Australia from 1923 to 1929

== August 26, 1967 (Saturday) ==
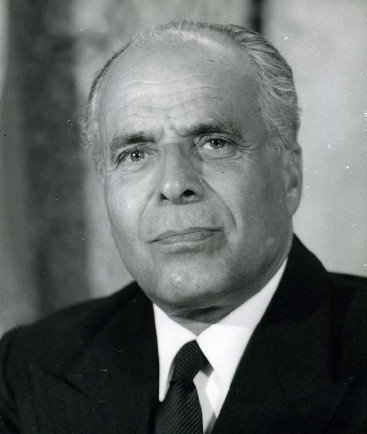
President Bourguiba

- Tunisia's President Habib Bourguiba broke with the leaders of other Arab nations and said that they should recognize the legitimacy of the nation of Israel. "It is a United Nations member and its existence is challenged only by the Arab states. In these circumstances, it is useless to continue ignoring this reality and claim to wipe Israel off the map. In so doing, one drives himself into near total isolation."
- Antonín Novotný, the President of Czechoslovakia and the First Secretary of the nation's Communist Party, had a controversial visit to the cultural institution in the city of Martin, located in the Slovak part of the Eastern European nation. Novotný, an ethnic Czech, got angry after the institution's director asked him for permission to collect Slovak books and newspapers published abroad, and accused the director of "Slovak bourgeois nationalism", then left the building and refused to accept presents that had been prepared for his visit. The incident would lead a large group of the Party's Presidium leaders to decide that Novotný needed to be removed from leadership, which would happen in January.
- U.S. Air Force Major George E. Day was shot down while flying a mission over North Vietnam. After being captured, he would escape from North Vietnam, be recaptured in South Vietnam by Viet Cong guerrillas, and remain a prisoner of war for five years and seven months, finally being released on March 14, 1973. On March 4, 1976, Day (promoted to Colonel) would be awarded the Medal of Honor. The citation would note that "His personal bravery in the face of deadly enemy pressure was significant in saving the lives of fellow aviators who were still flying against the enemy."
- A bus accident killed 35 passengers and seriously injured 28 others Peru when their bus fell off a road about 250 miles (400 km) east of Lima.

== August 27, 1967 (Sunday) ==
- CBS Laboratories announced Electronic Video Recording (EVR), a high quality, film-based video format, in a press release, with a goal of being marketed worldwide "in late 1969 or early 1970". The system used a 7-inch (180 mm) wide film cartridge that would have retailed for as little as seven dollars, and could provide "an hour of black-and-white visual material or a half-hour of color programming... a fraction of the cost of today's magnetic tape recording widely employed in commercial TV", and could be seen with the aid of a "playback machine [that] could be put on top of a TV set and connected to the antenna terminals of one or a dozen receivers". The machine, "roughly the size of a kitchen bread box", would have an initial manufacturing cost of $285 before markup for retail sale. Although the EVR player could not be used for recording, its resolution was high enough that its individual book pages could be read clearly in freeze frame. "The contents of a 24-volume encyclopedia could be recorded on a cartridge," the release noted, "with an index lever enabling the viewer to pick out the particular reference material he required."
- A group of 16 experienced skydivers were drowned after jumping from an airplane that was 10 miles (16 km) away from its intended target. The group had taken off from Wakeman, Ohio, in a B-25 airplane, and had jumped without realizing that they were parachuting into Lake Erie rather than a field in Huron, Ohio.
- The British Army began the final withdrawal of its troops from Aden.
- Died:
  - Sir Paul Dukes, 78, British MI6 officer known as "The Man with a Hundred Faces" for his disguises and alternative identities while infiltrating the Communist Party during his espionage in Russia.
  - Brian Epstein, 32, manager of The Beatles, died from an overdose of barbiturates.

== August 28, 1967 (Monday) ==
- Three days of torrential rains began in Japan's Niigata Prefecture, with 13.8 inches (350 mm) falling in 48 hours and causing landslides and massive flooding. Before the rain abated, at least 135 people were dead or missing, with 53 confirmed and 82 others unaccounted for. The Japan Fire and Disaster Management Agency concluded that 138 people died, with the towns of Shibata and Tainai suffering the greatest loss, along with villages in the Agano River valley.
- British Prime Minister Harold Wilson took personal control of the Department of Economic Affairs, removing Michael Stewart as Secretary and replacing him with Peter Shore, who would serve in an advisory role and shifting 20 other department officials to new jobs.
- A new law took effect in Texas making it a criminal offense to hunt the Texas horned lizard or to trap it for commercial purposes.

== August 29, 1967 (Tuesday) ==
- The Arab Summit opened at Khartoum and was attended by representatives of most of the Arab nations with the exception of Syria. On the first day, the oil-producing members voted to lift an embargo against exports to the United States and the United Kingdom. The bar had been imposed less than three months earlier following the outbreak of the Six-Day War with Israel.
- The final episode of The Fugitive aired on ABC. It was seen by an estimated 78 million viewers, the largest audience for a single TV series episode in U.S. television history up to that time, a record that would not be broken until November 21, 1980, with the broadcast of an episode of the TV drama Dallas.
- The government of East Germany began the process of painting the Berlin Wall white. West Berlin police speculated that the purpose was to make it easier for border guards to spot people attempting to flee East Berlin at nighttime.
- Former child actress Shirley Temple, now Shirley Temple Black, announced her candidacy for U.S. Congress as representative of California's 11th District.
- Robert F. Thompson of the Manned Spacecraft Center recommended refocusing the Apollo program. His proposal was that, by 1969, Apollo astronauts would be launched into Earth orbit, and that by 1970, two long-term missions of four weeks and eight weeks would be made using an orbital Workshop. The Apollo Telescope Mount would be put in orbit in 1971, by which time missions of up to one year would be held, expanded as much as two. In the years that followed the initial Moon landings, longer lunar missions with astronauts would take place under the proposal.
- Born:
  - Neil Gorsuch, U.S. Supreme Court Justice since 2017; in Denver
  - Anton Newcombe, American singer-songwriter and founder of the rock group "The Brian Jonestown Massacre"; in Newport Beach, California

== August 30, 1967 (Wednesday) ==
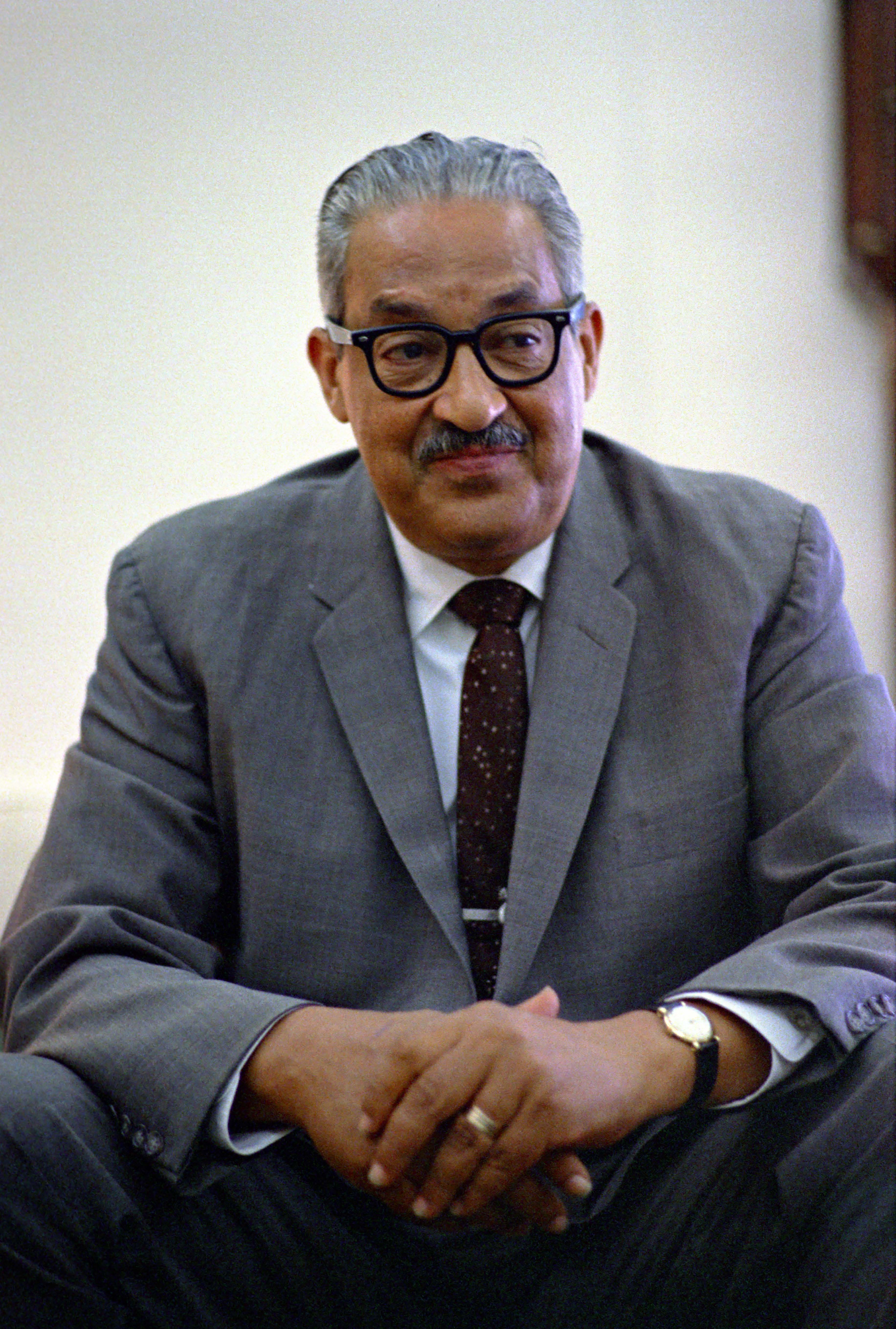
Marshall

- By a vote of 69 to 11 in the United States Senate, Thurgood Marshall was confirmed as the first African American Justice of the United States Supreme Court. Ten of the eleven votes against him came from the southern states, joined by Senator Robert Byrd of West Virginia. On the other hand, six U.S. senators from the Deep South — J. William Fulbright of Arkansas, William Spong of Virginia, both Senators from Tennessee (Howard Baker and Albert Gore Sr.) and both from Texas (John Tower and Ralph Yarborough) — voted in his favor. Marshall's confirmation had taken 78 days to be completed, nearly three times as long as any other appointee by President Johnson to the High Court. During hearings before the Senate Judiciary Committee, he endured questioning from U.S. Senator Strom Thurmond that would be compared by Time magazine as being similar "to a white registrar administering a literacy test designed to confound even the best-educated Negro", a strategy which "made it more unlikely that any serious Senator would want to question him seriously." Marshall would be sworn into office on September 1 and would take his seat on the bench on October 2, serving until 1992.
- Died: Ad Reinhardt, 53, American abstract painter

== August 31, 1967 (Thursday) ==
- Meeting at Khartoum in the Sudan during the Arab League summit, President Gamel Abdel Nasser of Egypt agreed to withdraw its troops from further participation in the War in Yemen in return for a ceasefire with Saudi Arabia, and King Faisal of Saudi Arabia agreed.
- Died:
  - Tamara Bunke, 29, Argentine-born member of Che Guevara's Cuban guerrilla forces in the Bolivian Insurgency, was killed in an ambush by the Bolivian Army, along with eight of her comrades in arms. Tania, celebrated in Cuba as a revolutionary hero, was shot while wading across the Vado del Yeso, a ford across the Bolivia's Río Grande in the Vallegrande Province. The group had been betrayed by a local resident, Honorato Rosas, who accepted a fee in return for being guided to the crossing. Her burial site would be discovered in September 1988 outside of the town of Vallegrande and is now interred in a monument at Santa Clara, Cuba.
  - Ilya Ehrenburg, 76, Soviet journalist and author
