= Outline of Saint Kitts and Nevis =

Overview of and topical guide to Saint Kitts and Nevis

The Flag of Saint Kitts and Nevis

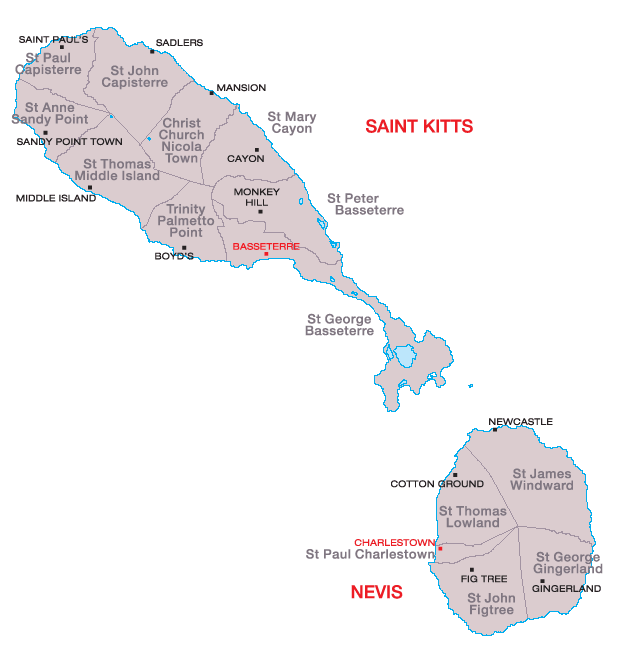
An enlargeable map of the Federation of Saint Kitts and Nevis

The following outline is provided as an overview of and topical guide to Saint Kitts and Nevis:

The Federation of Saint Kitts and Nevis, also known as Saint Christopher and Nevis, is a sovereign federal two-island nation located in the Leeward Islands in the Caribbean Sea. It is the smallest nation in the Americas, in both area and population.

The capital city and headquarters of government for the federated state is on the larger island of Saint Kitts. The smaller state of Nevis lies about 2 miles (3 km) southeast of Saint Kitts, across a shallow channel called "The Narrows".

Historically, the British dependency of Anguilla was also a part of this union, which was then known collectively as Saint Christopher-Nevis-Anguilla.

Saint Kitts and Nevis are geographically part of the Leeward Islands. To the north-northwest lie the islands of Sint Eustatius, Saba, Saint Barthélemy, and Saint-Martin/Sint Maarten. To the east and northeast are Antigua and Barbuda, and to the southeast is the small uninhabited island of Redonda, and the island of Montserrat, which currently has an active volcano (see Soufrière Hills.)

Saint Kitts and Nevis were amongst the first islands in the Caribbean to be settled by Europeans. Saint Kitts was home to the first British and French colonies in the Caribbean.

Saint Kitts and Nevis is the smallest nation on Earth to ever host a World Cup event; it was one of the host venues of the 2007 Cricket World Cup.

== General reference ==
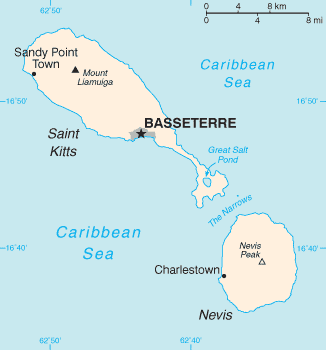
An enlargeable basic map of Saint Kitts and Nevis

- Pronunciation:
- Common English country names: Saint Kitts and Nevis or Saint Christopher and Nevis
- Official English country names: The Federation of Saint Kitts and Nevis or the Federation of Saint Christopher and Nevis
- Common endonym(s):
- Official endonym(s):
- Adjectival(s):
- Demonym(s):
- Etymology: Name of Saint Kitts and Nevis
- ISO country codes: KN, KNA, 659
- ISO region codes: See ISO 3166-2:KN
- Internet country code top-level domain: .kn

== Geography of Saint Kitts and Nevis ==
Geography of Saint Kitts and Nevis

- Saint Kitts and Nevis are...
  - a pair of islands
  - a country
    - an island country
    - a nation state
    - a Commonwealth realm
- Location:
  - Northern Hemisphere and Western Hemisphere
    - North America (off the East Coast of the United States, southeast of Puerto Rico)
  - Atlantic Ocean
    - Caribbean
      - Antilles
        - Lesser Antilles (island chain)
          - Leeward Islands
  - Time zone: Eastern Caribbean Time (UTC-04)
  - Extreme points of Saint Kitts and Nevis
    - High: Mount Liamuiga on Saint Kitts 1,156 m (3,793 ft)
    - Low: Caribbean Sea 0 m
  - Land boundaries: none
  - Coastline: Caribbean Sea 135 km
- Population of Saint Kitts and Nevis: 50,000 – 201st most populous country
- Area of Saint Kitts and Nevis: 261
- Atlas of Saint Kitts and Nevis

=== Environment of Saint Kitts and Nevis ===
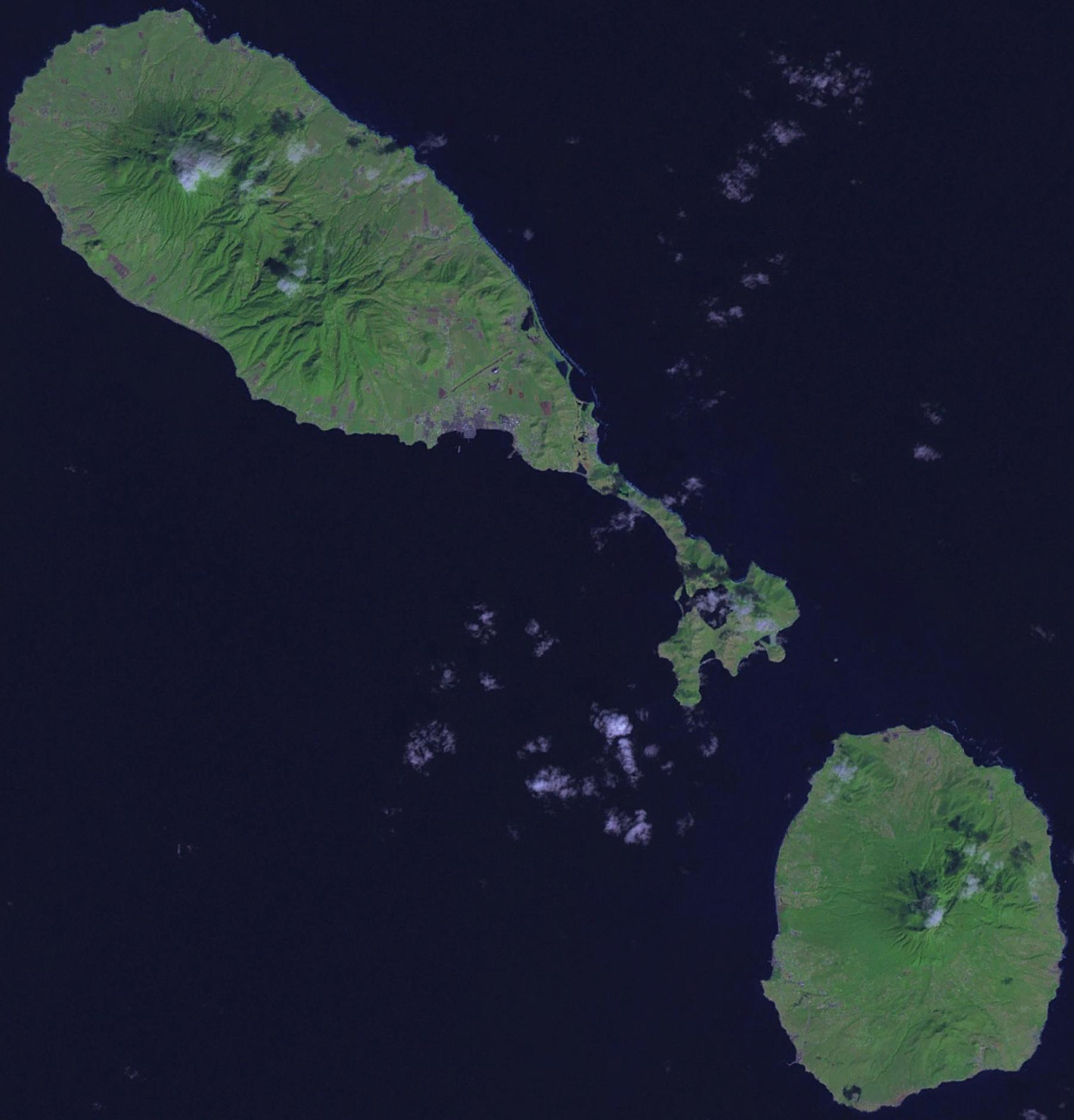
An enlargeable satellite image of Saint Kitts and Nevis

- Climate of Saint Kitts and Nevis
- Renewable energy in Saint Kitts and Nevis
- Geology of Saint Kitts and Nevis
- Protected areas of Saint Kitts and Nevis
  - Biosphere reserves in Saint Kitts and Nevis
  - National parks of Saint Kitts and Nevis
- Wildlife of Saint Kitts and Nevis
  - Fauna of Saint Kitts and Nevis
    - Birds of Saint Kitts and Nevis
    - Mammals of Saint Kitts and Nevis

==== Natural geographic features of Saint Kitts and Nevis ====
- Fjords of Saint Kitts and Nevis
- Glaciers of Saint Kitts and Nevis
- Islands of Saint Kitts and Nevis
- Lakes of Saint Kitts and Nevis
- Mountains of Saint Kitts and Nevis
  - Volcanoes in Saint Kitts and Nevis
- Rivers of Saint Kitts and Nevis
  - Waterfalls of Saint Kitts and Nevis
- Valleys of Saint Kitts and Nevis
- World Heritage Sites in Saint Kitts and Nevis

=== Regions of Saint Kitts and Nevis ===
Regions of Saint Kitts and Nevis

==== Ecoregions of Saint Kitts and Nevis ====
List of ecoregions in Saint Kitts and Nevis

- Ecoregions in Saint Kitts and Nevis

=== Demography of Saint Kitts and Nevis ===
Demographics of Saint Kitts and Nevis

== Government and politics of Saint Kitts and Nevis ==
Politics of Saint Kitts and Nevis

- Form of government:
- Capital of Saint Kitts and Nevis: Basseterre
- Elections in Saint Kitts and Nevis
- Political parties in Saint Kitts and Nevis

=== Branches of the government of Saint Kitts and Nevis ===
Government of Saint Kitts and Nevis

==== Executive branch of the government of Saint Kitts and Nevis ====
- Head of state: King of Saint Kitts and Nevis, King Charles III
- Head of government: Prime Minister of Saint Kitts and Nevis,
- Cabinet of Saint Kitts and Nevis

==== Legislative branch of the government of Saint Kitts and Nevis ====
- Parliament of Saint Kitts and Nevis (bicameral)
  - Upper house: Senate of Saint Kitts and Nevis
  - Lower house: House of Commons of Saint Kitts and Nevis

==== Judicial branch of the government of Saint Kitts and Nevis ====
Court system of Saint Kitts and Nevis

- Supreme Court of Saint Kitts and Nevis

=== Foreign relations of Saint Kitts and Nevis ===
Foreign relations of Saint Kitts and Nevis

- Diplomatic missions in Saint Kitts and Nevis
- Diplomatic missions of Saint Kitts and Nevis

==== International organization membership ====
The Federation of Saint Kitts and Nevis is a member of:

- African, Caribbean, and Pacific Group of States (ACP)
- Agency for the Prohibition of Nuclear Weapons in Latin America and the Caribbean (OPANAL)
- Caribbean Community and Common Market (Caricom)
- Caribbean Development Bank (CDB)
- Commonwealth of Nations
- Food and Agriculture Organization (FAO)
- Group of 77 (G77)
- International Bank for Reconstruction and Development (IBRD)
- International Civil Aviation Organization (ICAO)
- International Criminal Court (ICCt)
- International Criminal Police Organization (Interpol)
- International Development Association (IDA)
- International Federation of Red Cross and Red Crescent Societies (IFRCS)
- International Finance Corporation (IFC)
- International Fund for Agricultural Development (IFAD)
- International Labour Organization (ILO)
- International Maritime Organization (IMO)
- International Monetary Fund (IMF)
- International Olympic Committee (IOC)
- International Red Cross and Red Crescent Movement (ICRM)
- International Telecommunication Union (ITU)
- Multilateral Investment Guarantee Agency (MIGA)
- Nonaligned Movement (NAM)
- Organisation for the Prohibition of Chemical Weapons (OPCW)
- Organization of American States (OAS)
- Organization of Eastern Caribbean States (OECS)
- United Nations (UN)
- United Nations Conference on Trade and Development (UNCTAD)
- United Nations Educational, Scientific, and Cultural Organization (UNESCO)
- United Nations Industrial Development Organization (UNIDO)
- Universal Postal Union (UPU)
- World Federation of Trade Unions (WFTU)
- World Health Organization (WHO)
- World Intellectual Property Organization (WIPO)
- World Trade Organization (WTO)

=== Law and order in Saint Kitts and Nevis ===
Law of Saint Kitts and Nevis

- Constitution of Saint Kitts and Nevis
- Crime in Saint Kitts and Nevis
- Human rights in Saint Kitts and Nevis
  - LGBT rights in Saint Kitts and Nevis
  - Freedom of religion in Saint Kitts and Nevis
- Law enforcement in Saint Kitts and Nevis

=== Military of Saint Kitts and Nevis ===
Military of Saint Kitts and Nevis

- Command
  - Commander-in-chief:
    - Ministry of Defence of Saint Kitts and Nevis
- Forces
  - Army of Saint Kitts and Nevis
  - Navy of Saint Kitts and Nevis
  - Air Force of Saint Kitts and Nevis
  - Special forces of Saint Kitts and Nevis
- Military history of Saint Kitts and Nevis
- Military ranks of Saint Kitts and Nevis

=== Local government in Saint Kitts and Nevis ===
Local government in Saint Kitts and Nevis

== History of Saint Kitts and Nevis ==
History of Saint Kitts and Nevis

- Timeline of the history of Saint Kitts and Nevis
- Current events of Saint Kitts and Nevis
- Military history of Saint Kitts and Nevis

== Culture of Saint Kitts and Nevis ==
Culture of Saint Kitts and Nevis

- Architecture of Saint Kitts and Nevis
- Cuisine of Saint Kitts and Nevis
- Festivals in Saint Kitts and Nevis
- Languages of Saint Kitts and Nevis
- Media in Saint Kitts and Nevis
- National symbols of Saint Kitts and Nevis
  - Coat of arms of Saint Kitts and Nevis
  - Flag of Saint Kitts and Nevis
  - National anthem of Saint Kitts and Nevis
- People of Saint Kitts and Nevis
- Public holidays in Saint Kitts and Nevis
- Records of Saint Kitts and Nevis
- Religion in Saint Kitts and Nevis
  - Christianity in Saint Kitts and Nevis
  - Hinduism in Saint Kitts and Nevis
  - Islam in Saint Kitts and Nevis
  - Judaism in Saint Kitts and Nevis
  - Sikhism in Saint Kitts and Nevis
- World Heritage Sites in Saint Kitts and Nevis

=== Art in Saint Kitts and Nevis ===
- Art in Saint Kitts and Nevis
- Cinema of Saint Kitts and Nevis
- Literature of Saint Kitts and Nevis
- Music of Saint Kitts and Nevis
- Television in Saint Kitts and Nevis
- Theatre in Saint Kitts and Nevis

=== Sports in Saint Kitts and Nevis ===
Sports in Saint Kitts and Nevis

- Football in Saint Kitts and Nevis
- Saint Kitts and Nevis at the Olympics

== Economy and infrastructure of Saint Kitts and Nevis ==
Economy of Saint Kitts and Nevis

- Economic rank, by nominal GDP (2007): 176th (one hundred and seventy sixth)
- Agriculture in Saint Kitts and Nevis
- Banking in Saint Kitts and Nevis
  - National Bank of Saint Kitts and Nevis
- Communications in Saint Kitts and Nevis
  - Internet in Saint Kitts and Nevis
- Companies of Saint Kitts and Nevis
- Currency of Saint Kitts and Nevis: Dollar
  - ISO 4217: XCD
- Energy in Saint Kitts and Nevis
  - Energy policy of Saint Kitts and Nevis
  - Oil industry in Saint Kitts and Nevis
- Mining in Saint Kitts and Nevis
- Tourism in Saint Kitts and Nevis
- Transport in Saint Kitts and Nevis
- Saint Kitts and Nevis Stock Exchange

== Education in Saint Kitts and Nevis ==
Education in Saint Kitts and Nevis

== Infrastructure of Saint Kitts and Nevis ==
- Health care in Saint Kitts and Nevis
- Transportation in Saint Kitts and Nevis
  - Airports in Saint Kitts and Nevis
  - Rail transport in Saint Kitts and Nevis
  - Roads in Saint Kitts and Nevis
- Water supply and sanitation in Saint Kitts and Nevis

== See also ==
Saint Kitts and Nevis

- Index of Saint Kitts and Nevis-related articles
- List of international rankings
- List of Saint Kitts and Nevis-related topics
- Member state of the Commonwealth of Nations
- Member state of the United Nations
- Monarchy of Saint Kitts and Nevis
- Outline of geography
- Outline of North America
- Outline of the Caribbean
