= Index of Saint Kitts and Nevis–related articles =

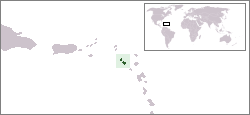
The location of the Federation of Saint Kitts and Nevis

The following is an alphabetical list of topics related to the Federation of Saint Kitts and Nevis.

== 0–9 ==
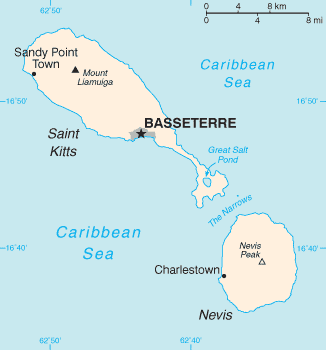
A map of Saint Kitts and Nevis

- .kn – Internet country code top-level domain for Saint Kitts and Nevis

== A ==
- Americas
  - North America
    - North Atlantic Ocean
      - West Indies
        - Caribbean Sea
          - Antilles
            - Lesser Antilles
              - Islands of Saint Kitts and Nevis
- Anglo-America
- Antilles
- Atlas of Saint Kitts and Nevis
- Attorney General of Saint Kitts and Nevis

== B ==
- Basseterre on Saint Kitts – Capital of Saint Kitts and Nevis

== C ==
- Capital of Saint Kitts and Nevis: Basseterre on Saint Kitts
- Caribbean
- Caribbean Community (CARICOM)
- Caribbean Sea
- Categories:
  - Category:Saint Kitts and Nevis
    - Category:Buildings and structures in Saint Kitts and Nevis
    - Category:Communications in Saint Kitts and Nevis
    - Category:Culture of Saint Kitts and Nevis
    - Category:Economy of Saint Kitts and Nevis
    - Category:Education in Saint Kitts and Nevis
    - Category:Environment of Saint Kitts and Nevis
    - Category:Geography of Saint Kitts and Nevis
    - Category:Government of Saint Kitts and Nevis
    - Category:History of Saint Kitts and Nevis
    - Category:Military of Saint Kitts and Nevis
    - Category:Politics of Saint Kitts and Nevis
    - Category:Saint Kitts and Nevis people
    - Category:Saint Kitts and Nevis stubs
    - Category:Saint Kitts and Nevis-related lists
    - Category:Society of Saint Kitts and Nevis
    - Category:Sport in Saint Kitts and Nevis
    - Category:Transport in Saint Kitts and Nevis
  - commons:Category:Saint Kitts and Nevis
- Christena disaster
- Coat of arms of Saint Kitts and Nevis
- Commonwealth of Nations
- Commonwealth realm of Saint Kitts and Nevis
- Communications in Saint Kitts and Nevis
- Constitution of Saint Kitts and Nevis

== D ==
- Demographics of Saint Kitts and Nevis

== E ==
- Economy of Saint Kitts and Nevis
- English colonization of the Americas
- English language

== F ==
The Flag of Saint Kitts and Nevis

- Federation of Saint Kitts and Nevis
- Flag of Saint Kitts and Nevis
- Foreign relations of Saint Kitts and Nevis

== G ==
- Geography of Saint Kitts and Nevis

== H ==
- History of Saint Kitts and Nevis

== I ==
- International Organization for Standardization (ISO)
  - ISO 3166-1 alpha-2 country code for Saint Kitts and Nevis: KN
  - ISO 3166-1 alpha-3 country code for Saint Kitts and Nevis: KNA
  - ISO 3166-2:KN region codes for Saint Kitts and Nevis
- Islands of Saint Kitts and Nevis:
  - Saint Kitts (Saint Christopher Island)
  - Nevis island
  - Booby Island (Saint Kitts and Nevis)
  - Crokus Cay
  - Dalzel Island
  - Dodan Island
  - Dulcina Island
  - East Cay
  - Eden Island
  - Fahie Island
  - Friars Island (Saint Kitts and Nevis)
  - Gardner Island (Saint Kitts and Nevis)
  - Garvey Island
  - Golden Cay
  - Jessop Island
  - Maddens
  - Meves Island
  - Otters Island
  - Sugar Loaf (Saint Kitts and Nevis)
  - Vambelle Island

== L ==
- Lists related to Saint Kitts and Nevis:
  - Diplomatic missions of Saint Kitts and Nevis
  - LGBT rights in Saint Kitts and Nevis (Gay rights)
  - List of cities in Saint Kitts and Nevis
  - List of islands of Saint Kitts and Nevis
  - List of diplomatic missions in Saint Kitts and Nevis
  - List of rivers of Saint Kitts and Nevis
  - List of Saint Kitts and Nevis-related topics
  - Topic outline of Saint Kitts and Nevis

== M ==
- Military of Saint Kitts and Nevis
- Monarchy of Saint Kitts and Nevis
- Music of Saint Kitts and Nevis

== O ==
- Organisation of Eastern Caribbean States (OECS)

== P ==
- Politics of Saint Kitts and Nevis

== R ==
- Religion in Saint Kitts and Nevis
- Rugby union in Saint Kitts and Nevis

== S ==
- Saint Kitts and Nevis
- Saint Kitts Creole language
- The Scout Association of Saint Kitts and Nevis
- States headed by Elizabeth II

== T ==
- Topic outline of Saint Kitts and Nevis
- Transport in Saint Kitts and Nevis

== U ==
- United Nations, member state since 1983

== W ==
- Wikimedia Atlas of Saint Kitts and Nevis
- Wikipedia:WikiProject Topic outline/Drafts/Topic outline of Saint Kitts and Nevis

== See also ==
- Commonwealth of Nations
- List of Caribbean-related topics
- List of international rankings
- Lists of country-related topics
- Topic outline of geography
- Topic outline of North America
- Topic outline of Saint Kitts and Nevis
- United Nations
