= South Friar's Bay =

Bay in Saint Kitts and Nevis

Coordinates: 17°16′N 62°40′W

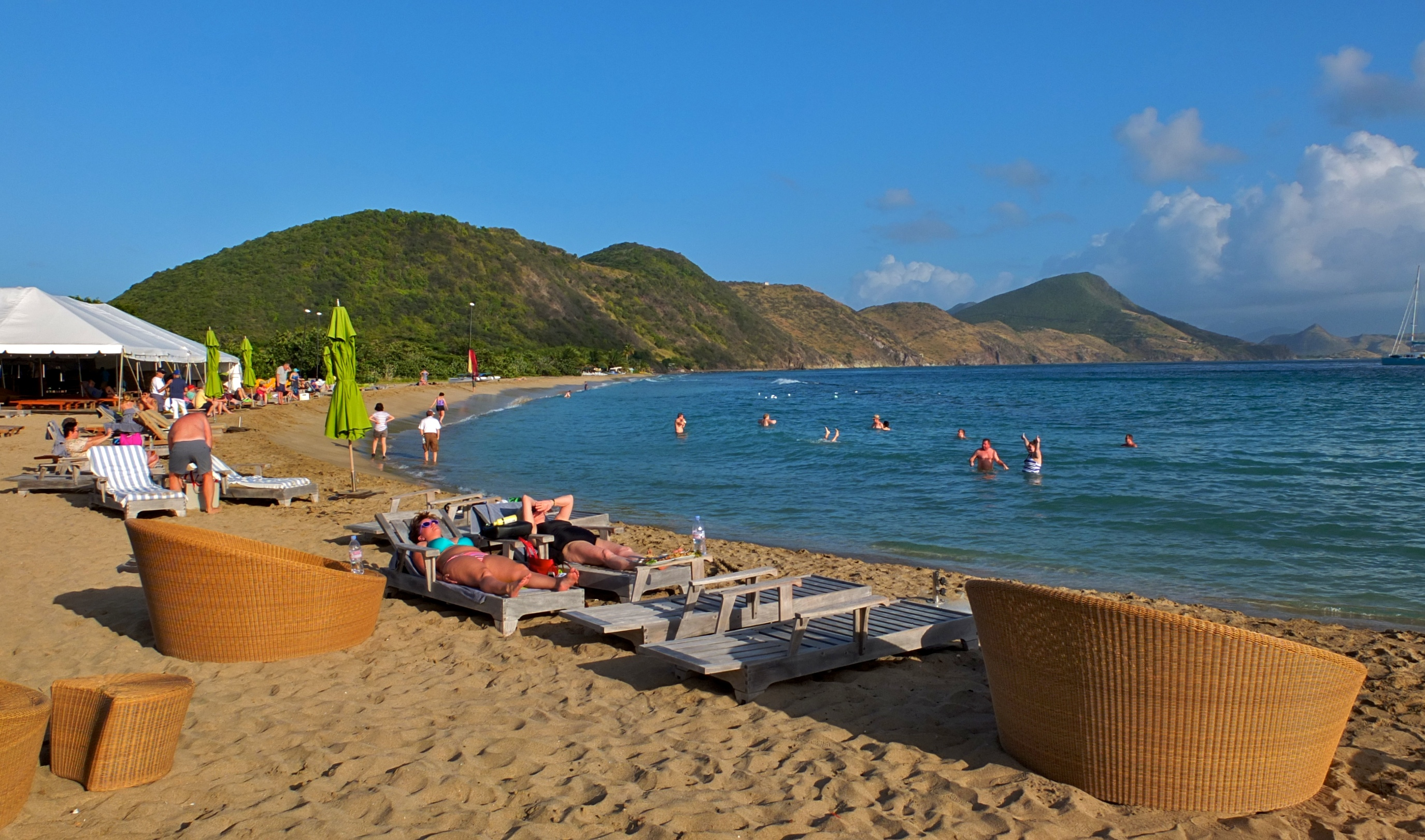
South Friar's Bay

South Friar's Bay is a bay in Saint George Basseterre Parish, Saint Kitts and Nevis. It is one of the two bays that stretch along the coast of the isthmus connecting the Southeast Peninsula, with the rest of the island of Saint Kitts. It is longer than its northern neighbour (North Friar's Bay). At their closest, the two coasts are less than one kilometre apart.

The beach at South Friar's Bay is 1,081 metres long. After years of sand mining and other heavy human activities, there was an effort to re-establish safe grounds for turtles to nest on the beach.

== See also ==
- Geography of Saint Kitts and Nevis
