= List of companies of Saint Kitts and Nevis =

Location of Saint Kitts and Nevis

Saint Kitts and Nevis is a two-island country in the West Indies. Located in the Leeward Islands chain of the Lesser Antilles, it is the smallest sovereign state in the Americas, in both area and population. The country is a Commonwealth realm, with the British monarch (currently King Charles III) as head of state.

The country's economy is characterised by its dominant tourism, agriculture and light manufacturing industries. Sugar was the primary export from the 1940s on, but rising production costs, low world market prices, and the government's efforts to reduce dependence on it have led to a growing diversification of the agricultural sector. In 2005, the government decided to close down the state-owned sugar company, which had experienced losses and was a significant contributor to the fiscal deficit.

== Notable firms ==
This list includes notable companies with primary headquarters located in the country. The industry and sector follow the Industry Classification Benchmark taxonomy. Organizations which have ceased operations are included and noted as defunct.

Notable companies Status: P=Private, S=State; A=Active, D=Defunct
Name	Industry	Sector	Headquarters	Founded	Notes	Status	
Kittitian Hill	Consumer services	Hotels	Saint Paul Capisterre	2006	Resort	P	A
Phoenix Airways	Consumer services	Airlines	Basseterre	2012	Commercial airline	P	A
West Indies Power	Utilities	Alternative electricity	Charlestown	2007	Geothermal	P	A

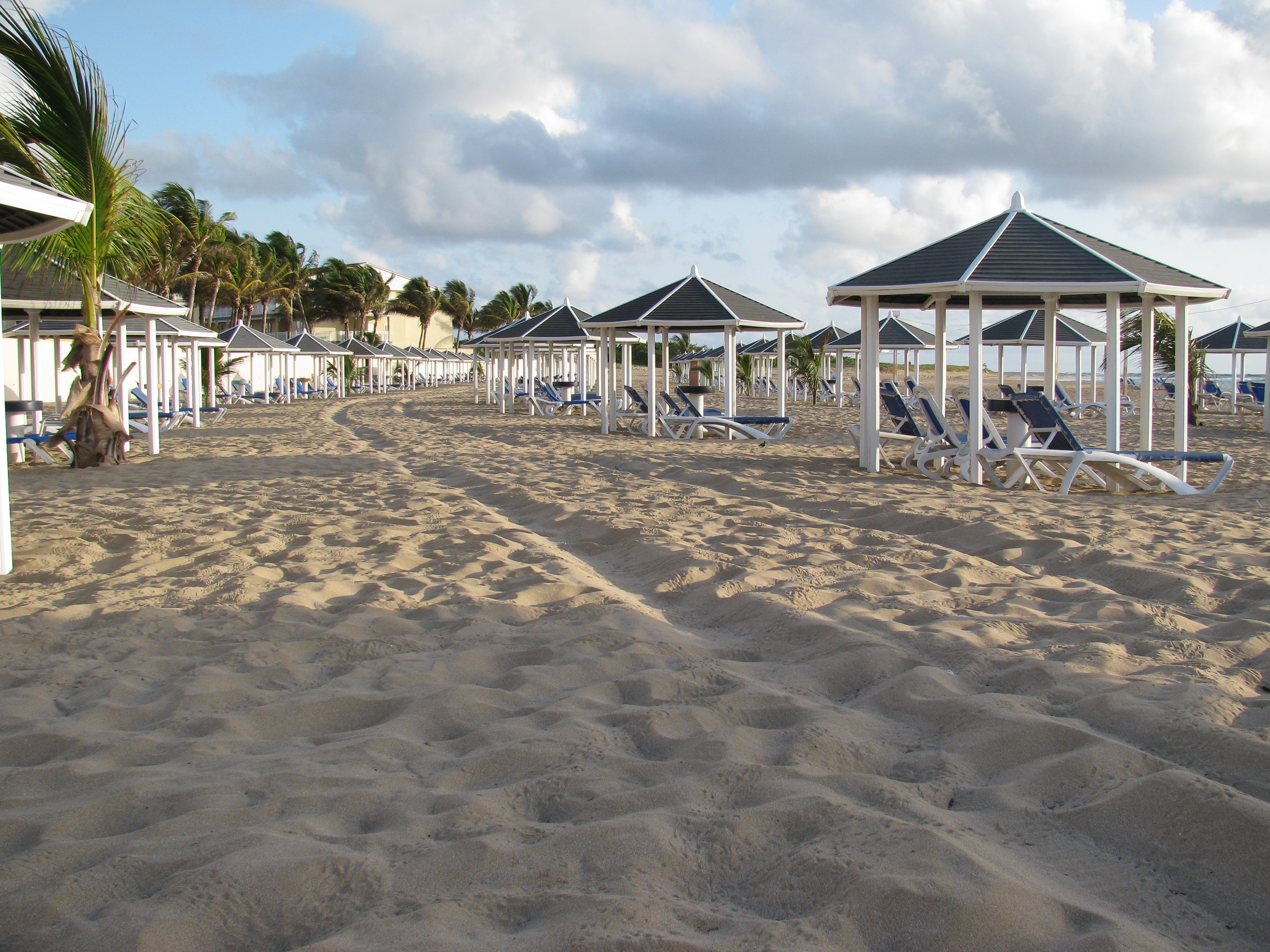
Tourist beach resort in Saint Kitts.

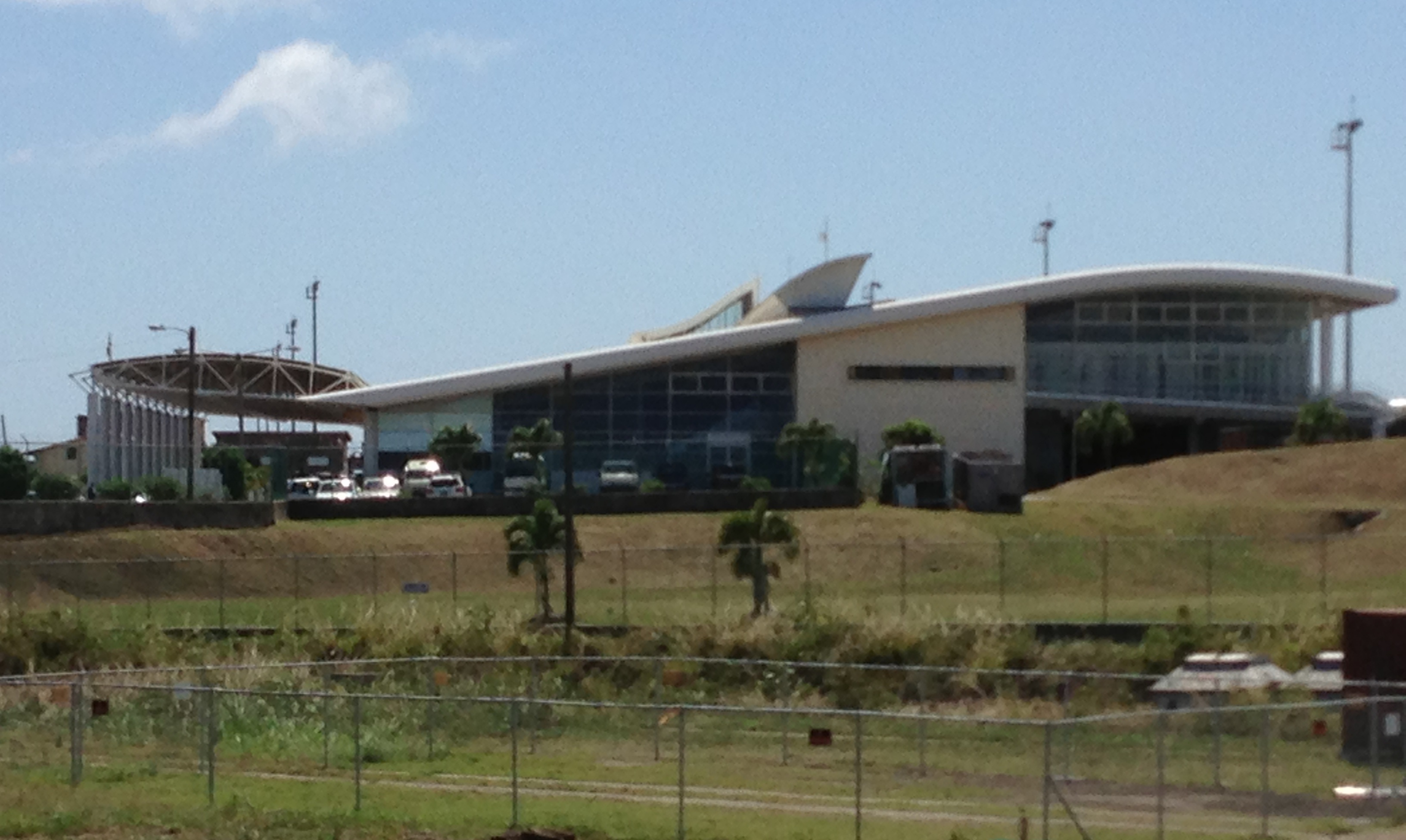
Saint Kitts Airport.
