= Saint Kitts and Nevis Rugby Association =

- Sport: Rugby union
- Founded: 2008
- NACRA affiliation: 2009 (Affiliate member)

The Saint Kitts and Nevis Rugby Association is the rugby governing body in Saint Kitts and Nevis. Based in Basseterre, it was founded in 2008. The association became affiliated to the North America Caribbean Rugby Association (NACRA, formerly NAWIRA) in the following year, but it is not currently a member of World Rugby.

The British first introduced the game to the islands in the 1960s, and for a number of years it was mainly played by expatriates. Now it has some uptake by the local population. Games against visiting ships, and touring sides are common, as well as against neighbouring Caribbean islands.

== See also ==
- Rugby union in Saint Kitts and Nevis
- Sport in Saint Kitts and Nevis
