= North Friar's Bay =

Bay in Saint Kitts and Nevis

Coordinates: 17°17′N 62°40′W

North Friar's Bay is one of the two bays that stretch along the coast of the isthmus connecting the Southeast Peninsula, with the rest of the island of Saint Kitts. It is shorter than its southern neighbour (South Friar's Bay). At their closest, the two coasts are less than one kilometre apart.
