= ZIZ =

National broadcaster of St. Kitts & Nevis

Coordinates: 17.2999°N 62.7327°W

- TV service logo
- Type: National broadcaster
- Country: Saint Kitts and Nevis
- First air date: 1935 (shortwave); 5 March 1961 (relaunch; radio); 3 December 1972 (television)
- TV stations: Channel 5
- Radio stations: 95.9, 96.1, 96.3, and 96.9 FM
- Headquarters: Basseterre
- Owner: Government of Saint Kitts and Nevis
- Dissolved: ca. 1940 (shortwave)
- Former callsigns: VP2LO (shortwave, 1935–1939)
- Official website: zizonline.com

ZIZ Broadcasting Corporation (ZBC), commonly referred to as ZIZ, is the national broadcasting service of Saint Kitts and Nevis in the West Indies. Originating in 1935 as the shortwave station VP2LO, it adopted its present-day callsign in 1939 but went off the air shortly after; it relaunched on the AM format in 1961, and expanded to television in 1972. A government-owned service and a member of the Caribbean Media Corporation (CMC), ZIZ carries its programming across four FM frequencies and one TV channel; the AM outlet remained in operation as late as the 2010s.

== History ==
ZIZ is a government-owned national commercial broadcaster, and is also a member of the Caribbean Media Corporation (CMC). Broadcasting in Saint Kitts was introduced with VP2 km, an amateur radio outlet owned by Kenneth Mallalieu, in 1934. VP2 km was succeeded in 1935 by VP2LO, a shortwave station and the territory's first commercial radio service. Airing on 6380 kc. (Note: "Kc." stands for kilocycle, whose modern-day equivalent is the kilohertz (kHz).) from the town of Basseterre, VP2LO began with 150 watts of transmission power, which was later increased to 500. It was headed by Administrator D.R. Stewart and launched by two sons of his, and was "operated by the ICA Radio Sales & Service Laboratories in conjunction with the Caribbean Broadcasting Service". It adopted the new call sign of ZIZ on 21 January 1939, (Note: Sources differ as to the programming allotment; Clarke 1939 gives a 35-minute runtime starting at 5:00 p.m. AST, while Berg 2013 states its 30-minute schedule ran on Wednesday evenings at 7:00 EST.) (Note: The original VP2LO callsign was reused by a Saint Lucia outfit in the late 1950s.) but sometime after Stewart's death the following month, the original station went off the air. (Note: ZIZ was still cited in foreign publications as late as May 1940.)

The service returned to the airwaves as an AM outlet on 5 March 1961, serving what was then Saint Kitts-Nevis-Anguilla. Headquartered in the Springfield neighbourhood of Basseterre, it was relaunched with £23,000 in Colonial Development and Welfare funds from 1959, plus an EC$1.25 million loan from Cable & Wireless, under the presence of West Indies Federation Governor-General Lord Hailes. Initially carrying a three-hour evening schedule, the revived ZIZ transitioned to airing across two separate sessions (6:45–10:00 ECT in the morning, and 6:00–10:00 ECT at night) some three years later. The lineup consisted of local shows and imported BBC material; with special programming, a broadcast day could run up to 15 hours. An eponymous 1962 song by The Mighty Saint, a local calypsonian, commemorated the relaunch. Its overnight success was noted by the West India Committee over the next two years, who wrote in 1963 that it had "so rapidly become part of the life of the community that it is hard to imagine public life without it" and in 1964 that the "universally praised" service's programme selection was "imaginative and varied".

Although the revived ZIZ started out as a public service, it would soon switch to a revenue-based commercial format to keep it on air, a move that "was received with very great regret by many people" in early 1963 according to the committee. By 1979, its power and daily schedule had respectively expanded to 20 kilowatts (up from 660 watts in earlier years) and 17 hours of programming. In 1984, 60% of ZIZ's schedule was music-oriented; 35% of that amount came from the Caribbean, and the remainder from the U.S. and Europe.

ZIZ launched a television division on 3 December 1972; during that decade, it operated one transmitter and four translators across the territory. Throughout the mid-1980s, the station aired 5½ hours of programming every weeknight, and ran a separate telex-based information channel on the island country's newly established cable system. In 2001, its lineup aired from 4:00 till 11:00 p.m., switching to Fox Family programming during off hours; in Nevis, the 7:00–11:00 portion carried material from that island's Information Service. As of 2006, ZIZ was Saint Kitts and Nevis' sole national television channel. Foreign programming accounted for 90% of ZIZ Television's offerings in 1975; with regards to U.S. content, this figure became 60–65% in the 1980s. Around the turn of the 21st century, the local political opposition saw the station as a government mouthpiece and accused it of denying them airtime.

== Availability ==
ZIZ's radio programming is broadcast across the FM frequencies 95.9, 96.1, 96.3, and 96.9. The AM feed began transmission on 570 kHz in the 1960s, and was also heard during that period across the British Leeward Islands as well as the neighbouring French and Dutch territories. It later moved to 555 kHz, and remained there as late as the 2010s. The television service, which airs on channel 5, served the entire Leeward archipelago in the 1970s and was included in the mid-1984 launch of the national cable system. In 1989, it was received on channel 9 in northern St. Kitts Island and channel 13 in Nevis.

== See also ==
- Voice of Nevis, a radio station serving the eponymous island
- Telecommunications in Saint Kitts and Nevis
