= West Indies Power =

Former utility company in the Netherlands Antilles

Coordinates: 17.1396°N 62.6293°W

West Indies Power was a geothermal power company registered in 2001 in the Netherlands Antilles and with the head office in Charlestown, Saint Kitts and Nevis. It conducted studies on geothermal power projects in Nevis, Saba and Dominica.

== Projects at Nevis ==
At Nevis, West Indies Power had two geothermal projects. In February 2007, the Nevis Island Administration issued a license to West Indies Power for exploration of the geothermal resource of Nevis. West Indies Power commenced explorations at the same month. On 29 April 2009, a geothermal contract was signed with the Nevis Island Administration and a power purchase agreement was signed with the Nevis Electricity Company Ltd.

In 2014, the Nevis Island Administration terminated the geothermal contract, citing the lack of actual progress made, making way for a new group planning to develop the project. As of 2020, the Nevis geothermal project is co-developed between NRE International Inc (NREI) and the Nevis Island Administration (NIA).

The Nevis 1 project was located at Spring Hill. The drilling at Spring Hill commenced in January 2008. The geothermal reservoir at Spring Hill was discovered on 2 June 2008 and the geotechnical work started in July 2008. The Nevis 1 plant was to supply 50 megawatts (MW) of electricity, enough to fulfill all of Nevis' demand (approximately 10 MW) as also to export to neighboring Saint Kitts and other nearby islands via submarine electrical transmission cables.

The Nevis 2 project was located at Upper Jessups Village in the St. Thomas Parish. The drilling started on 24 June 2008.

== Project in Dominica ==
The Government of Dominica awarded geothermal exploration and development license to West Indies Power (Dominica) Ltd. on 10 July 2008. In August 2011, it received an approval for exploratory drilling in the Soufrière Valley.

The company was accused of paying bribes to the Dominican government in exchange for securing the license.

== Project in Saba ==
In Saba, West Indies Power developed geothermal power plant with capacity of 75 MW.

== Structure ==
The parent company, West Indies Power Holdings B.V., was registered in the Netherlands Antilles. It had offices in Charlestown, Nevis, and in Roseau, Dominica. West Indies Power operated through its subsidiaries West Indies Power (Nevis) Ltd., West Indies Power (Dominica) Ltd. and West Indies Power (Saba) B.V.

== Management ==
The chief executive officer of West Indies Power Holding was Kerry McDonald. The general manager of West Indies Power (Nevis) Ltd. was Rawlinson Isaac and the chief operations officerand head of drilling operations was Bobby Tinsley. The chief finance officer was Dimitrijus Apockinas.

Russian businessman Vladimir Antonov is reported to have a stake in the company.
