= Rugby union in Saint Kitts and Nevis =

- Governing body: Saint Kitts and Nevis; Rugby Association
- First played: 1960s

Rugby union in Saint Kitts and Nevis is a minor, but growing sport. Cricket and association football tend to be more popular. The British first introduced the game to the islands, and for a number of years it was mainly played by expatriates. Now it has some uptake by the local population. Games against visiting ships, and touring sides are common, as well as against neighbouring Caribbean islands.

In 2009, International Rugby Board Regional Development Officer Scott Harland visited Saint Kitts and Nevis, and stated that he was impressed by local interest in the game. Harland also said that the sport had suffered from an "expatriate" image but that it was not reflected by the facts on the ground. There is a school rugby programme in Molineux, and a Peace Corps volunteer at St. Theresa’s Convent School has also been involved in coaching the game. However, the islands' small population of 42,696 means it is unlikely to emerge as a power in the near future.

The governing body is the Saint Kitts and Nevis Rugby Association.
