= Telecommunications in Saint Kitts and Nevis =

This is a list of Communications in Saint Kitts and Nevis.

== Telephone ==
Saint Kitts and Nevis is a member of the North American Numbering Plan (NANP), whose assigned area code is area code 869.

When dialing from a telephone in Saint Kitts and Nevis, telephone users can dial the local seven digit number. When calling a telephone number in the United States, Canada or any other NANP member country from Saint Kitts and Nevis, the user would dial 1 + area code + phone number.

When calling a telephone number inside Saint Kitts and Nevis from the United States, Canada or other countries participating in the NANP, the user would dial 1 + 869 + seven digit phone number.

Telephones - main lines in use: 17,000 (1997)

Telephones - mobile cellular: at least 30,000(2005)

Telephone system:

General assessment: good inter-island and international connections

Domestic: inter-island links to Antigua and Barbuda and Saint Martin (Guadeloupe and Netherlands Antilles) are handled by VHF/UHF/SHF radiotelephone

International: International calls are carried by radiotelephone to Antigua and Barbuda and switched there to submarine cable or to Intelsat; or carried to Saint Martin (Guadeloupe and Netherlands Antilles) by radiotelephone and switched to Intelsat.

== Radio ==
Radio broadcast stations: AM 3, FM 1, shortwave 0 (1998)

- 550 ZIZ (Bird Rock)
- 820
- 860 VON - Voice of Nevis
- 89.9 ZIZ (formerly 90.0)
- 90.3 Sugar City Rock FM
- 92.9 Gem Radio Network
- 93.3 Gem Radio Network
- 94.1 SKNBC Radio One
- 95.9 ZIZ (formerly 96.0) (Nevis)
- 96.1 ZIZ (formerly 96.0) (Basseterre)
- 96.7 Big Wave Radio (Saint Kitts)
- 96.9 ZIZ
- 98.3 Vybz FM/Family FM
- 98.9 Winn FM
- 102.5 Kyss 102.5 FM - The Love Radio
- 103.3 Goodwill Radio
- 104.5 Goodwill Radio
- 106.5 Freedom FM

Radios: 28,000 (1997)

== Television ==
Television broadcast stations: 1 (ZIZ-TV, plus three repeaters) (1997)

Televisions: 10,000 (1997)

== Internet ==
Country code: .kn (Top-level domain)

Internet Service Providers (ISPs): 16 (2000)

Internet users: 2,001 (2000)

Average Internet Speed: 27.84 mbps download/10.74 Mbit/s upload (2020)
