= Geology of Saint Kitts and Nevis =

Saint Kitts and Nevis forms part of the northern part of the Lesser Antilles island arc. It was formed by the subduction of the North American Plate beneath the Caribbean Plate. Radiocarbon dating indicates the last major eruptions on Saint Kitts occurred approximately 2,000 years ago. There are still a few active centres of seismic activity in the islands.

== Formation ==
Saint Kitts and Nevis forms part of the northern part of the Lesser Antilles island arc. The archipelago was formed by the subduction of the North American Plate beneath the Caribbean Plate, and are exposed summits of a submerged mountain chain.

Radiocarbon dating indicates the last major eruptions on Saint Kitts occurred approximately 2,000 years ago, with the more recent studies dating it to 1,620 ± 50 years. Lithic-rich breccias and ash flow deposits formed accumulations up to more than 20 m (66 ft) thick and 150 m (490 ft) wide. The volcanic rock types in the islands range from basalt to rhyolite.

== Saint Kitts ==
St. Kitts has four main volcanic centres–Salt Pond Peninsula, South East Range, Middle Range, and Mount Liamuiga. The Salt Pond Peninsula is the oldest, made mainly of lava domes and pyroclastic deposits, dated to about 2.3–2.8 million years ago. The South East Range was formed around 1 million years ago, and is composed mostly of lava flows. Both of these centres show no geothermal or seismic activity and are unlikely to erupt again. The Middle Range has a crater lake, and though traditionally considered extinct, it is not definitively established as such. Mount Liamuiga, the youngest centre, had its last eruption about 1,600 years ago. There is continuous geothermal and seismic activity, indicating a potential for future volcanic eruptions on the island. Liamuiga has a summit crate rwhich is 900–1,000 m (3,000–3,300 ft) wide and 244 m (801 ft) deep, and contained a shallow lake until 1959 , which disappeared and had re-formed by 2006.

== Nevis Island ==
Nevis Island consists of a single volcanic complex made up of several volcanic domes or centres. There are a few older limestone formations from the mid-Eocene, the oldest exposed material on the island. There are seven volcanic centres–Hurricane Hill, Round Hill, Cades Bay, Saddle Hill, Red Cliff, Butlers Mountain, and Nevis Peak. The oldest centres (Hurricane Hill, Round Hill, and Cades Bay) date about 3.4 to 2.7 million years ago, while Saddle Hill and Butlers Mountain were formed around 1.8–1.1 million years ago. Red Cliff is an eroded remnant of a volcanic cone, and its age is uncertain. Most of these centres are extinct, with no seismic activity. Nevis Peak, the youngest, aged at about 0.98–0.10 million years old, is the only active centre.
