= List of birds of Saint Kitts and Nevis =

This is a list of the bird species recorded in Saint Kitts and Nevis. Saint Kitts and Nevis is a small West Indian country, a federation of two neighboring islands in the Leeward Islands chain of the Lesser Antilles. The avifauna of Saint Kitts and Nevis included 236 species according to Bird Checklists of the World as of July 2022. Of them, 171 are rare or accidental and seven have been introduced. One is endemic and three have been extirpated.

This list is presented in the taxonomic sequence of the Check-list of North and Middle American Birds, 7th edition through the 63rd Supplement, published by the American Ornithological Society (AOS). Common and scientific names are also those of the Check-list, except that the common names of families are from the Clements taxonomy because the AOS list does not include them.

The following tags have been used to highlight several categories. The tags and notes on population status are also from Bird Checklists of the World; the latter refer to status worldwide, not solely on Saint Kitts and Nevis.

- (A) Accidental - a species that rarely or accidentally occurs in Saint Kitts and Nevis
- (I) Introduced - a species introduced directly to Saint Kitts and Nevis or elsewhere in the New World
- (Ex) Extirpated - a species that no longer occurs in Saint Kitts and Nevis although populations exist elsewhere

== Ducks, geese, and waterfowl ==
Order: Anseriformes Family: Anatidae

Anatidae includes the ducks and most duck-like waterfowl, such as geese and swans. These birds are adapted to an aquatic existence with webbed feet, flattened bills, and feathers that are excellent at shedding water due to an oily coating.

- White-faced whistling-duck, Dendrocygna viduata (A)
- Black-bellied whistling-duck, Dendrocygna autumnalis (A)
- West Indian whistling-duck, Dendrocygna arborea (A) (Near-threatened)
- Fulvous whistling-duck, Dendrocygna bicolor (A)
- Wood duck, Aix sponsa (A)
- Blue-winged teal, Spatula discors (A)
- Cinnamon teal, Spatula cyanoptera (A)
- Northern shoveler, Spatula clypeata (A)
- Gadwall, Mareca strepera (A)
- American wigeon, Mareca americana (A)
- Mallard, Anas platyrhynchos (A)
- White-cheeked pintail, Anas bahamensis (A)
- Northern pintail, Anas acuta (A)
- Green-winged teal, Anas crecca (A)
- Canvasback, Aythya valisineria (A)
- Redhead, Aythya americana (A)
- Ring-necked duck, Aythya collaris (A)
- Greater scaup, Aythya marila (A)
- Lesser scaup, Aythya affinis (A)
- Hooded merganser, Lophodytes cucullatus (A)
- Red-breasted merganser, Mergus serrator (A)
- Masked duck, Nomonyx dominicus (A)
- Ruddy duck, Oxyura jamaicensis (A)

== Guineafowl ==
Order: Galliformes Family: Numididae

Guineafowl are a group of African, seed-eating, ground-nesting birds that resemble partridges, but with featherless heads and spangled grey plumage.

- Helmeted guineafowl, Numida meleagris (A) (I)

== New World quail ==
Order: Galliformes Family: Odontophoridae

The New World quails are small, plump terrestrial birds only distantly related to the quails of the Old World, but named for their similar appearance and habits.

- Northern bobwhite, Colinus virginianus (I) (Ex) (Near-threatened)

== Pheasants, grouse, and allies ==
Order: Galliformes Family: Phasianidae

Phasianidae consists of the pheasants and their allies. These are terrestrial species, variable in size but generally plump with broad relatively short wings. Many species are gamebirds or have been domesticated as a food source for humans.

- Red junglefowl, Gallus gallus (I)

== Flamingos ==
Order: Phoenicopteriformes Family: Phoenicopteridae

Flamingos are gregarious wading birds, usually 3 to 5 feet (0.9 to 1.5 m) tall, found in both the Western and Eastern Hemispheres. Flamingos filter-feed on shellfish and algae. Their oddly shaped beaks are specially adapted to separate mud and silt from the food they consume and, uniquely, are used upside-down.

- American flamingo, Phoenicopterus ruber (A)

== Grebes ==
Order: Podicipediformes Family: Podicipedidae

Grebes are small to medium-large freshwater diving birds. They have lobed toes and are excellent swimmers and divers. However, they have their feet placed far back on the body, making them quite ungainly on land.

- Pied-billed grebe, Podilymbus podiceps (A)

== Pigeons and doves ==
Order: Columbiformes Family: Columbidae

Pigeons and doves are stout-bodied birds with short necks and short slender bills with a fleshy cere.

- Rock pigeon, Columba livia (I)
- Scaly-naped pigeon, Patagioenas squamosa
- White-crowned pigeon, Patagioenas leucocephala (A) (Near-threatened)
- Eurasian collared-dove, Streptopelia decaocto (I)
- Common ground dove, Columbina passerina
- Ruddy quail-dove, Geotrygon montana (A)
- Bridled quail-dove, Geotrygon mystacea
- White-winged dove, Zenaida asiatica (A)
- Zenaida dove, Zenaida aurita

== Cuckoos ==
Order: Cuculiformes Family: Cuculidae

The family Cuculidae includes cuckoos, roadrunners, and anis. These birds are of variable size with slender bodies, long tails, and strong legs.

- Smooth-billed ani, Crotophaga ani (A)
- Yellow-billed cuckoo, Coccyzus americanus
- Mangrove cuckoo, Coccyzus minor
- Black-billed cuckoo, Coccyzus erythropthalmus (A)

== Nightjars and allies ==
Order: Caprimulgiformes Family: Caprimulgidae

Nightjars are medium-sized nocturnal birds that usually nest on the ground. They have long wings, short legs, and very short bills. Most have small feet, of little use for walking, and long pointed wings. Their soft plumage is camouflaged to resemble bark or leaves.

- Common nighthawk, Chordeiles minor
- Antillean nighthawk, Chordeiles gundlachii (A)
- Chuck-will's-widow, Antrostomus carolinensis (A) (Near-threatened)

== Swifts ==
Order: Apodiformes Family: Apodidae

Swifts are small birds which spend the majority of their lives flying. These birds have very short legs and never settle voluntarily on the ground, perching instead only on vertical surfaces. Many swifts have long swept-back wings which resemble a crescent or boomerang.

- Black swift, Cypseloides niger (A) (Vulnerable)
- White-collared swift, Streptoprocne zonaris (A)
- Lesser Antillean swift, Chaetura martinica (A)

== Hummingbirds ==
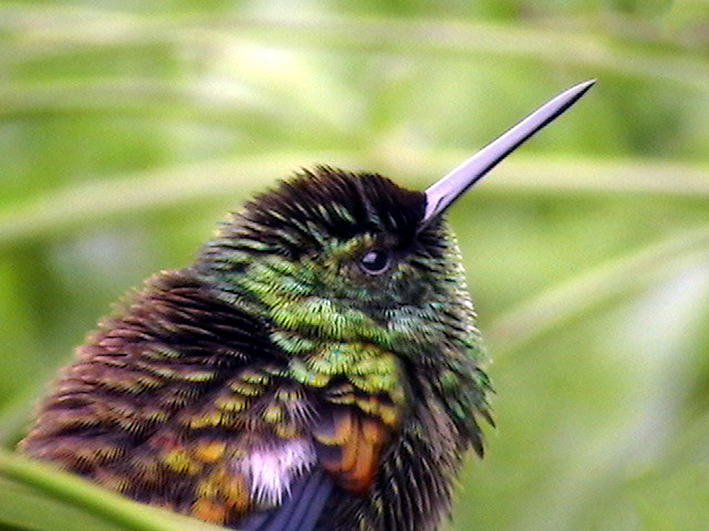
Antillean crested hummingbird

Order: Apodiformes Family: Trochilidae

Hummingbirds are small birds capable of hovering in mid-air due to the rapid flapping of their wings. They are the only birds that can fly backwards.

- Purple-throated carib, Eulampis jugularis
- Green-throated carib, Eulampis holosericeus
- Antillean crested hummingbird, Orthorhyncus cristatus

== Rails, gallinules, and coots ==
Order: Gruiformes Family: Rallidae

Rallidae is a large family of small to medium-sized birds which includes the rails, crakes, coots, and gallinules. Typically they inhabit dense vegetation in damp environments near lakes, swamps, or rivers. In general they are shy and secretive birds, making them difficult to observe. Most species have strong legs and long toes which are well adapted to soft uneven surfaces. They tend to have short, rounded wings and to be weak fliers.

- Clapper rail, Rallus crepitans (A)
- Sora, Porzana carolina (A)
- Common gallinule, Gallinula galeata
- American coot, Fulica americana
- Purple gallinule, Porphyrio martinicus (A)

== Stilts and avocets ==
Order: Charadriiformes Family: Recurvirostridae

Recurvirostridae is a family of large wading birds which includes the avocets and stilts. The avocets have long legs and long up-curved bills. The stilts have extremely long legs and long, thin, straight bills.

- Black-necked stilt, Himantopus mexicanus
- American avocet, Recurvirostra americana (A)

== Oystercatchers ==
Order: Charadriiformes Family: Haematopodidae

The oystercatchers are large and noisy plover-like birds, with strong bills used for smashing or prising open molluscs.

- American oystercatcher, Haematopus palliatus (A)

== Plovers and lapwings ==
Order: Charadriiformes Family: Charadriidae

The family Charadriidae includes the plovers, dotterels, and lapwings. They are small to medium-sized birds with compact bodies, short thick necks, and long, usually pointed, wings. They are found in open country worldwide, mostly in habitats near water.

- Black-bellied plover, Pluvialis squatarola (A)
- American golden-plover, Pluvialis dominica (A)
- Pacific golden-plover, Pluvialis fulva (A)
- Killdeer, Charadrius vociferus (A)
- Semipalmated plover, Charadrius semipalmatus
- Piping plover, Charadrius melodus (A) (Near-threatened)
- Wilson's plover, Charadrius wilsonia
- Collared plover, Charadrius collaris (A)
- Snowy plover, Charadrius nivosus (Near-threatened)

== Sandpipers and allies ==
Order: Charadriiformes Family: Scolopacidae

Scolopacidae is a large diverse family of small to medium-sized shorebirds including the sandpipers, curlews, godwits, shanks, tattlers, woodcocks, snipes, dowitchers, and phalaropes. The majority of these species eat small invertebrates picked out of the mud or soil. Variation in length of legs and bills enables multiple species to feed in the same habitat, particularly on the coast, without direct competition for food.

- Whimbrel, Numenius phaeopus (A)
- Black-tailed godwit, Limosa limosa (A) (Near-threatened)
- Hudsonian godwit, Limosa haemastica (A)
- Marbled godwit, Limosa fedoa (A)
- Ruddy turnstone, Arenaria interpres
- Red knot, Calidris canutus (A) (Near-threatened)
- Ruff, Calidris pugnax (A)
- Stilt sandpiper, Calidris himantopus (A)
- Curlew sandpiper, Calidris ferruginea (A) (Near-threatened)
- Sanderling, Calidris alba
- Dunlin, Calidris alpina (A)
- Baird's sandpiper, Calidris bairdii (A)
- Least sandpiper, Calidris minutilla
- White-rumped sandpiper, Calidris fuscicollis (A)
- Buff-breasted sandpiper, Calidris subruficollis (A) (Near-threatened)
- Pectoral sandpiper, Calidris melanotos (A)
- Semipalmated sandpiper, Calidris pusilla (Near-threatened)
- Western sandpiper, Calidris mauri (A)
- Short-billed dowitcher, Limnodromus griseus (A)
- Long-billed dowitcher, Limnodromus scolopaceus (A)
- Wilson's snipe, Gallinago delicata (A)
- Wilson's phalarope, Phalaropus tricolor (A)
- Spotted sandpiper, Actitis macularia
- Solitary sandpiper, Tringa solitaria (A)
- Lesser yellowlegs, Tringa flavipes (A)
- Willet, Tringa semipalmata (A)
- Greater yellowlegs, Tringa melanoleuca (A)

== Skuas and jaegers ==
Order: Charadriiformes Family: Stercorariidae

Skuas are in general medium to large birds, typically with gray or brown plumage, often with white markings on the wings. They have longish bills with hooked tips and webbed feet with sharp claws. They look like large dark gulls, but have a fleshy cere above the upper mandible. They are strong, acrobatic fliers.

- Pomarine jaeger, Stercorarius pomarinus (A)
- Parasitic jaeger, Stercorarius parasiticus (A)
- Long-tailed jaeger, Stercorarius longicaudus (A)

== Gulls, terns, and skimmers ==
Order: Charadriiformes Family: Laridae

Laridae is a family of medium to large seabirds and includes gulls, kittiwakes, terns, and skimmers. They are typically gray or white, often with black markings on the head or wings. They have stout, longish bills and webbed feet. Terns are a group of generally medium to large seabirds typically with gray or white plumage, often with black markings on the head. Most terns hunt fish by diving but some pick insects off the surface of fresh water. Terns are generally long-lived birds, with several species known to live in excess of 30 years.

- Bonaparte's gull, Chroicocephalus philadelphia (A)
- Black-headed gull, Chroicocephalus ridibundus (A)
- Laughing gull, Leucophaeus atricilla
- Ring-billed gull, Larus delawarensis (A)
- Herring gull, Larus argentatus (A)
- Lesser black-backed gull, Larus fuscus (A)
- Great black-backed gull, Larus marinus (A)
- Brown noddy, Anous stolidus (A)
- Sooty tern, Onychoprion fuscata (A)
- Bridled tern, Onychoprion anaethetus (A)
- Least tern, Sternula antillarum
- Gull-billed tern, Gelochelidon nilotica (A)
- Caspian tern, Hydroprogne caspia (A)
- Black tern, Chlidonias niger (A)
- Roseate tern, Sterna dougallii (A)
- Common tern, Sterna hirundo (A)
- Arctic tern, Sterna paradisaea (A)
- Forster's tern, Sterna forsteri (A)
- Royal tern, Thalasseus maxima
- Sandwich tern, Thalasseus sandvicensis (A)
- Black skimmer, Rynchops niger (A)

== Tropicbirds ==
Order: Phaethontiformes Family: Phaethontidae

Tropicbirds are slender white birds of tropical oceans with exceptionally long central tail feathers. Their heads and long wings have black markings.

- White-tailed tropicbird, Phaethon lepturus (A)
- Red-billed tropicbird, Phaethon aethereus (A)

== Southern storm-petrels ==
Order: Procellariiformes Family: Oceanitidae

The storm-petrels are the smallest seabirds, relatives of the petrels, feeding on planktonic crustaceans and small fish picked from the surface, typically while hovering. The flight is fluttering and sometimes bat-like. Until 2018, this family's species were included with the other storm-petrels in family Hydrobatidae.

- Wilson's storm-petrel, Oceanites oceanicus (A)

== Northern storm-petrels ==
Order: Procellariiformes Family: Hydrobatidae

Though the members of this family are similar in many respects to the southern storm-petrels, including their general appearance and habits, there are enough genetic differences to warrant their placement in a separate family.

- Leach's storm-petrel, Hydrobates leucorhous (A) (Vulnerable)
- Band-rumped storm-petrel, Hydrobates castro (A)

== Shearwaters and petrels ==
Order: Procellariiformes Family: Procellariidae

The procellariids are the main group of medium-sized "true petrels", characterised by united nostrils with medium septum and a long outer functional primary.

- Trindade petrel, Pterodroma arminjoniana (A) (Vulnerable)
- Herald petrel, Pterodroma heraldica (A)
- Black-capped petrel, Pterodroma hasitata (A)
- Cory's shearwater, Calonectris diomedea (A)
- Sooty shearwater, Ardenna grisea (A) (Near-threatened)
- Great shearwater, Ardenna gravis (A)
- Manx shearwater, Puffinus puffinus (A)
- Sargasso shearwater, Puffinus lherminieri (A)

== Frigatebirds ==
Order: Suliformes Family: Fregatidae

Frigatebirds are large seabirds usually found over tropical oceans. They are large, black and white, or completely black, with long wings and deeply forked tails. The males have colored inflatable throat pouches. They do not swim or walk and cannot take off from a flat surface. Having the largest wingspan-to-body-weight ratio of any bird, they are essentially aerial, able to stay aloft for more than a week.

- Magnificent frigatebird, Fregata magnificens

== Boobies and gannets ==
Order: Suliformes Family: Sulidae

The sulids comprise the gannets and boobies. Both groups are medium to large coastal seabirds that plunge-dive for fish.

- Masked booby, Sula dactylatra (A)
- Brown booby, Sula leucogaster
- Red-footed booby, Sula sula (A)

== Anhingas ==
Order: Suliformes Family: Anhingidae

Anhingas are cormorant-like water birds with very long necks and long, straight beaks. They are fish eaters which often swim with only their neck above the water.

- Anhinga, Anhinga anhinga (A)

== Cormorants and shags ==
Order: Suliformes Family: Phalacrocoracidae

Cormorants are medium-to-large aquatic birds, usually with mainly dark plumage and areas of colored skin on the face. The bill is long, thin, and sharply hooked. Their feet are four-toed and webbed, a distinguishing feature among the order Pelecaniformes.

- Double-crested cormorant, Nannopterum auritum
- Neotropic cormorant, Nannopterum brasilianum (A)

== Pelicans ==
Order: Pelecaniformes Family: Pelecanidae

Pelicans are large water birds with a distinctive pouch under their beak. As with other members of the order Pelecaniformes, they have webbed feet with four toes.

- Brown pelican, Pelecanus occidentalis

== Herons, egrets, and bitterns ==
Order: Pelecaniformes Family: Ardeidae

The family Ardeidae contains the bitterns, herons, and egrets. Herons and egrets are medium to large wading birds with long necks and legs. Bitterns tend to be shorter necked and more wary. Members of Ardeidae fly with their necks retracted, unlike other long-necked birds such as storks, ibises, and spoonbills.

- American bittern, Botaurus lentiginosus (A)
- Least bittern, Ixobrychus exilis (A)
- Great blue heron, Ardea herodias
- Gray heron, Ardea cinerea (A)
- Great egret, Ardea alba (A)
- Little egret, Egretta garzetta (A)
- Snowy egret, Egretta thula
- Little blue heron, Egretta caerulea
- Tricolored heron, Egretta tricolor (A)
- Reddish egret, Egretta rufescens (A) (Near-threatened)
- Cattle egret, Bubulcus ibis
- Green heron, Butorides virescens
- Black-crowned night-heron, Nycticorax nycticorax (A)
- Yellow-crowned night-heron, Nyctanassa violacea

== Ibises and spoonbills ==
Order: Pelecaniformes Family: Threskiornithidae

Threskiornithidae is a family of large terrestrial and wading birds which includes the ibises and spoonbills. They have long, broad wings with 11 primary and about 20 secondary feathers. They are strong fliers and despite their size and weight, very capable soarers.

- Glossy ibis, Plegadis falcinellus (A)
- Roseate spoonbill, Ajaia ajaja (A)

== New World vultures ==
Order: Cathartiformes Family: Cathartidae

The New World vultures are not closely related to Old World vultures, but superficially resemble them because of convergent evolution. Like the Old World vultures, they are scavengers. However, unlike Old World vultures, which find carcasses by sight, New World vultures have a good sense of smell with which they locate carrion.

- Turkey vulture, Cathartes aura (A)

== Osprey ==
Order: Accipitriformes Family: Pandionidae

The family Pandionidae contains only one species, the osprey. The osprey is a medium-large raptor which is a specialist fish-eater with a worldwide distribution.

- Osprey, Pandion haliaetus

== Hawks, eagles, and kites ==
Order: Accipitriformes Family: Accipitridae

Accipitridae is a family of birds of prey which includes hawks, eagles, kites, harriers, and Old World vultures. These birds have powerful hooked beaks for tearing flesh from their prey, strong legs, powerful talons, and keen eyesight.

- Northern harrier, Circus hudsonius (A)
- Sharp-shinned hawk, Accipiter striatus (A)
- Common black hawk, Buteogallus anthracinus (A)
- Broad-winged hawk, Buteo platypterus (A)
- Red-tailed hawk, Buteo jamaicensis

== Barn-owls ==
Order: Strigiformes Family: Tytonidae

Owls in the family Tytonidae are medium to large owls, with large heads and characteristic heart-shaped faces.

- Barn owl, Tyto alba (A)

== Owls ==
Order: Strigiformes Family: Strigidae

The typical owls are small to large solitary nocturnal birds of prey. They have large forward-facing eyes and ears, a hawk-like beak, and a conspicuous circle of feathers around each eye called a facial disk.

- Burrowing owl, Athene cunicularia (Ex)

== Kingfishers ==
Order: Coraciiformes Family: Alcedinidae

Kingfishers are medium-sized birds with large heads, long pointed bills, short legs, and stubby tails.

- Belted kingfisher, Megaceryle alcyon (A)

== Woodpeckers ==
Order: Piciformes Family: Picidae

Woodpeckers are small to medium-sized birds with chisel-like beaks, short legs, stiff tails, and long tongues used for capturing insects. Some species have feet with two toes pointing forward and two backward, while several species have only three toes. Many woodpeckers have the habit of tapping noisily on tree trunks with their beaks.

- Yellow-bellied sapsucker, Sphyrapicus varius (A)

== Falcons and caracaras ==
Order: Falconiformes Family: Falconidae

Falconidae is a family of diurnal birds of prey. They differ from hawks, eagles, and kites in that they kill with their beaks instead of their talons.

- American kestrel, Falco sparverius
- Merlin, Falco columbarius (A)
- Peregrine falcon, Falco peregrinus

== Tyrant flycatchers ==
Order: Passeriformes Family: Tyrannidae

Tyrant flycatchers are passerine birds which occur throughout North and South America. They superficially resemble the Old World flycatchers, but are more robust and have stronger bills. They do not have the sophisticated vocal capabilities of the songbirds. Most, but not all, have plain coloring. As the name implies, most are insectivorous.

- Caribbean elaenia, Elaenia martinica
- Stolid flycatcher, Myiarchus stolidus (A)
- Lesser Antillean flycatcher, Myiarchus oberi
- Eastern kingbird, Tyrannus tyrannus (A)
- Gray kingbird, Tyrannus dominicensis
- Fork-tailed flycatcher, Tyrannus savana (A)
- Lesser Antillean pewee, Contopus latirostris (A)

== Vireos, shrike-babblers, and erpornis ==
Order: Passeriformes Family: Vireonidae

The vireos are a group of small to medium-sized passerine birds. They are typically greenish in color and resemble New World warblers apart from their heavier bills.

- Yellow-throated vireo, Vireo flavifrons (A)
- Black-whiskered vireo, Vireo altiloquus

== Swallows ==
Order: Passeriformes Family: Hirundinidae

The family Hirundinidae is adapted to aerial feeding. They have a slender streamlined body, long pointed wings, and a short bill with a wide gape. The feet are adapted to perching rather than walking, and the front toes are partially joined at the base.

- Bank swallow, Riparia riparia (A)
- Tree swallow, Tachycineta bicolor (A)
- Purple martin, Progne subis (A)
- Caribbean martin, Progne dominicensis
- Barn swallow, Hirundo rustica
- Cliff swallow, Petrochelidon pyrrhonota (A)

== Mockingbirds and thrashers ==
Order: Passeriformes Family: Mimidae

The mimids are a family of passerine birds that includes thrashers, mockingbirds, tremblers, and the New World catbirds. These birds are notable for their vocalizations, especially their ability to mimic a wide variety of birds and other sounds heard outdoors. Their coloring tends towards dull grays and browns.

- Scaly-breasted thrasher, Allenia fusca
- Pearly-eyed thrasher, Margarops fuscatus
- Brown trembler, Cinclocerthia ruficauda
- Brown thrasher, Toxostoma rufum (A)
- Tropical mockingbird, Mimus gilvus (A)

== Thrushes and allies ==
Order: Passeriformes Family: Turdidae

The thrushes are a group of passerine birds that occur mainly in the Old World. They are plump, soft plumaged, small to medium-sized insectivores or sometimes omnivores, often feeding on the ground. Many have attractive songs.

- Veery, Catharus fuscescens (A)
- Swainson's thrush, Catharus ustulatus (A)
- Spectacled thrush, Turdus nudigenis (A)

== Waxbills and allies ==
Order: Passeriformes Family: Estrildidae

The members of this family are small passerine birds native to the Old World tropics. They are gregarious and often colonial seed eaters with short thick but pointed bills. They are all similar in structure and habits, but have wide variation in plumage colors and patterns.

- Scaly-breasted munia, Lonchura punctulata (I)

== Old World sparrows ==
Order: Passeriformes Family: Passeridae

Old World sparrows are small passerine birds. In general, sparrows tend to be small plump brownish or grayish birds with short tails and short powerful beaks. Sparrows are seed eaters, but they also consume small insects.

- House sparrow, Passer domesticus (A) (I)

== Finches, euphonias, and allies ==
Order: Passeriformes Family: Fringillidae

Finches are seed-eating passerine birds that are small to moderately large and have a strong beak, usually conical and in some species very large. All have twelve tail feathers and nine primaries. These birds have a bouncing flight with alternating bouts of flapping and gliding on closed wings, and most sing well.

- Lesser Antillean euphonia, Chlorophonia flavifrons

== Troupials and allies ==
Order: Passeriformes Family: Icteridae

The icterids are a group of small to medium-sized, often colorful, passerine birds restricted to the New World and include the grackles, New World blackbirds, and New World orioles. Most species have black as the predominant plumage color, often enlivened by yellow, orange, or red.

- Bobolink, Dolichonyx oryzivorus (A)
- Baltimore oriole, Icterus galbula (A)
- Shiny cowbird, Molothrus bonariensis (A)
- Carib grackle, Quiscalus lugubris (Ex)

== New World warblers ==
Order: Passeriformes Family: Parulidae

The New World warblers are a group of small, often colorful, passerine birds restricted to the New World. Most are arboreal, but some are terrestrial. Most members of this family are insectivores.

- Ovenbird, Seiurus aurocapilla (A)
- Worm-eating warbler, Helmitheros vermivorum (A)
- Louisiana waterthrush, Parkesia motacilla (A)
- Northern waterthrush, Parkesia noveboracensis (A)
- Golden-winged warbler, Vermivora chrysoptera (A) (Near-threatened)
- Black-and-white warbler, Mniotilta varia
- Prothonotary warbler, Protonotaria citrea (A)
- Kentucky warbler, Geothlypis formosa (A)
- Common yellowthroat, Geothlypis trichas (A)
- Hooded warbler, Setophaga citrina (A)
- American redstart, Setophaga ruticilla
- Cape May warbler, Setophaga tigrina (A)
- Northern parula, Setophaga americana
- Magnolia warbler, Setophaga magnolia (A)
- Yellow warbler, Setophaga petechia
- Chestnut-sided warbler, Setophaga pensylvanica (A)
- Blackpoll warbler, Setophaga striata (A) (Near-threatened)
- Black-throated blue warbler, Setophaga caerulescens (A)
- Pine warbler, Setophaga pinus (A)
- Yellow-rumped warbler, Setophaga coronata (A)
- Yellow-throated warbler, Setophaga dominica (A)
- Prairie warbler, Setophaga discolor (A)
- Adelaide's warbler, Setophaga adelaidae (A)
- Black-throated green warbler, Setophaga virens (A)

== Cardinals and allies ==
Order: Passeriformes Family: Cardinalidae

The cardinals are a family of robust seed-eating birds with strong bills. They are typically associated with open woodland. The sexes usually have distinct plumages.

- Summer tanager, Piranga rubra (A)
- Scarlet tanager, Piranga olivacea (A)
- Rose-breasted grosbeak, Pheucticus ludovicianus (A)
- Blue grosbeak, Passerina caerulea (A)
- Indigo bunting, Passerina cyanea (A)

== Tanagers and allies ==
Order: Passeriformes Family: Thraupidae

The tanagers are a large group of small to medium-sized passerine birds restricted to the New World, mainly in the tropics. Many species are brightly colored. As a family they are omnivorous, but individual species specialize in eating fruits, seeds, insects, or other types of food. Most have short, rounded wings.

- Grassland yellow-finch, Sicalis luteola (A)
- Bananaquit, Coereba flaveola
- St. Kitts bullfinch, Melopyrrha grandis (endemic)
- Greater Antillean bullfinch, Melopyrrha violacea (A)
- Lesser Antillean bullfinch, Loxigilla noctis
- Black-faced grassquit, Melanospiza bicolor
- Yellow-bellied seedeater, Sporophila nigricollis (A)
- Lesser Antillean saltator, Saltator albicollis (A)

== See also ==
- List of birds
- Lists of birds by region
