= Transport in Saint Kitts and Nevis =

Transport in Saint Christopher and Nevis (a two-island federation) includes normal road traffic, public buses, taxis, ferries, airports, and one railway.

Basseterre is the hub for all major roads in Saint Christopher. Charlestown, Nevis is the equivalent hub in Nevis. Driving is on the left.

The speed limit in settled areas is 40 km/h, with special caution to be taken around school zones. In rural areas the speed limit is 60 km/h.

The total length of roads in Saint Christopher and Nevis is 320 km. In 1999 it was estimated that 136 km were paved, and 184 km were unpaved.

== Public buses ==
The public buses are privately owned, but government-licensed, vans. They sometimes have a decorative name on the front, and they all have a green licence plate where the number starts with the letter "H" or "HA".

A bus may be flagged down anywhere along its route (not just at bus stop shelters), and the bus will also stop anywhere along its route (on request) to let off a passenger.

All bus fees (in Eastern Caribbean or EC dollars) are $2.50 for a trip of 5 miles or under, $3.00 for a trip of 5 to 10 miles, and $3.75 for a trip over 10 miles. ($1 US = $2.7 EC)

Destinations off of the main route are often possible on request, at the discretion of the driver, on payment of a small extra charge.

=== St. Kitts ===
There are 5 main bus routes on St. Kitts:

- Basseterre to Sandy Point travelling west, starting at the Ferry Terminal
- Basseterre to Capesterre travelling west, starting at the Ferry Terminal
- Basseterre to St. Peter's travelling north, starting at College Street Ghaut
- Basseterre to Molyneux travelling east, starting at Baker's Corner
- Basseterre to Saddler's travelling east, starting at Baker's Corner

(No public buses travel southwards to the main resort areas in Frigate Bay and the Southeast Peninsula of St. Kitts.)

=== Nevis ===
On Nevis, buses run both ways along the main ring-road around the island. All buses start off, and eventually finish up, in the capital of Nevis, Charlestown. Buses that will be travelling north out of Charlestown wait to leave from the southwest end of D. R. Walwyn Plaza. Buses travelling south from Charlestown wait to leave from the northern end of Memorial Square. At the termination points you can board a bus and wait for it to fill up before it leaves. If you are not sure you are climbing into the right bus, ask the driver if he goes to your destination.

== Taxis ==
Taxis are privately owned, but government licensed, vans. These vans usually have a name, and they all have yellow license plates where the number starts with the letter "T" or "TA".

The main taxi stand on St. Kitts is in Basseterre, on The Circus, phone number 466 6999, and there is a taxi stand at the airport too.

The main taxi stand on Nevis is in Charlestown, on the west side of D.R. Walwyn Plaza, and there is also a taxi stand at the airport.

A taxi can traverse any accessible area on the islands, including even dirt roads and trails, if the driver agrees.

== Harbours and ferries ==
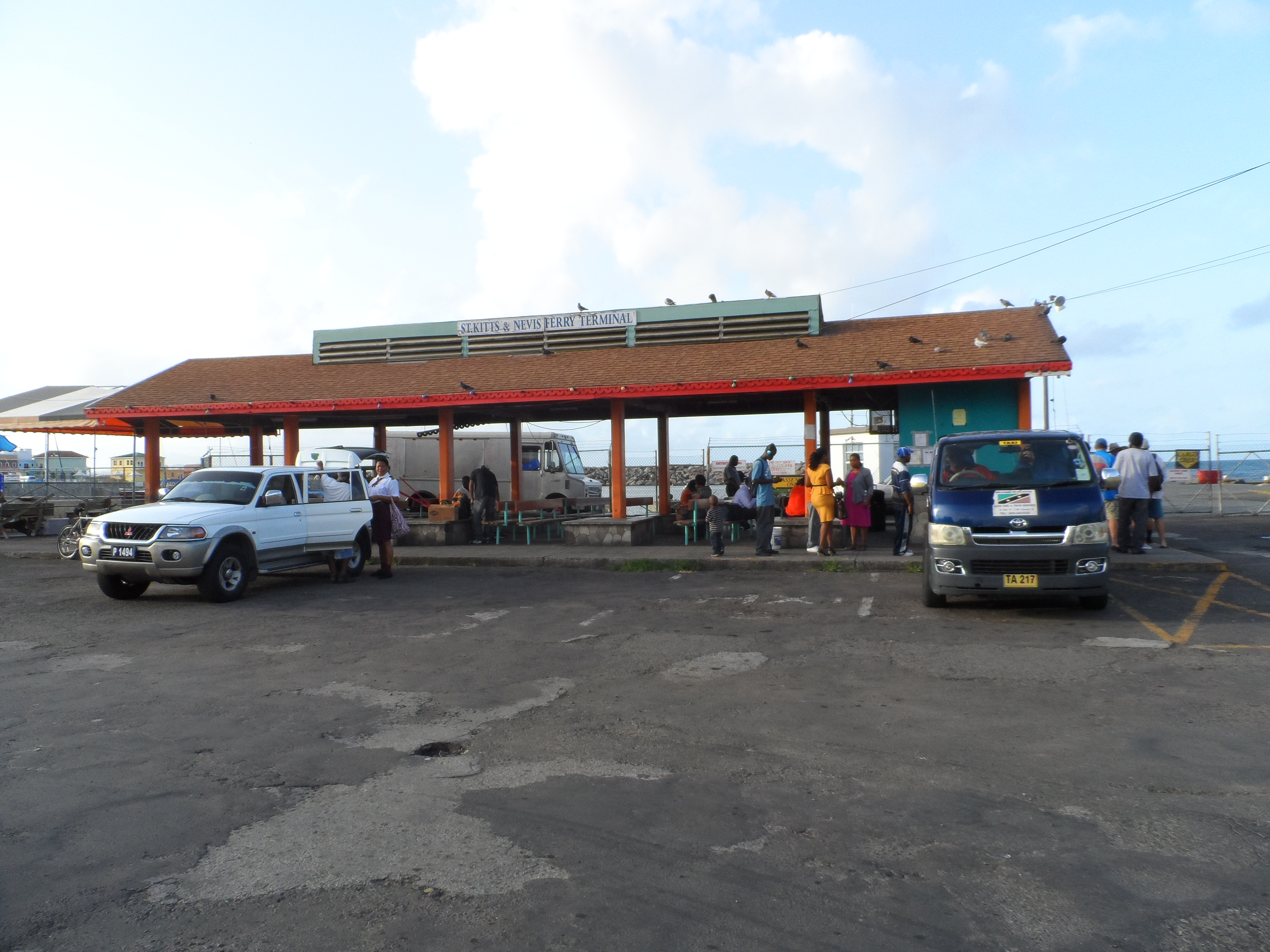
Saint Kitts and Nevis ferry terminal

=== St. Kitts ===
Basseterre is the location of all official harbouring services on Saint Kitts, though Coast Guard stations exist at Sandy Point Town and Dieppe Bay Town. The Deep Water Harbour at Basseterre is capable of both hosting and berthing of cruise ships or the handling of cargos. It is located to the extreme East of Basseterre Bay.

Port Zante, in the centre of Basseterre Bay, is for use of docking cruise ships only. The Port can accommodate the largest cruise ships in the world. It also has a marina facility.

The bay is also home to the popular ferry connection between Basseterre, St. Kitts and Charlestown, Nevis. There are several trips daily. On rare occasions there is a special ferry day trip from Basseterre to Oranjestad, St Eustatius and back again.

A relatively new (started in 2007) car ferry, which can take up to 35 cars and also takes pedestrian passengers, is called the "Sea Bridge" ferry, and is in operation between the two islands. This ferry traverses the narrow, 2-mile wide straight named 'The Narrows' between the two islands in 25 minutes, from Major's Bay in St. Kitts (at the tip of the southeastern peninsula), to Cades Bay in Nevis. Cars can also be carried by the "Sea Hustler" ferry, which operates out of Basseterre.

=== Nevis ===
Charlestown is the harbour for the government ferries which run between Charlestown and Basseterre on St. Kitts. There is a deep water port on the southern coast of Nevis for cargo ships.

The "Sea Bridge" ferry, which takes cars (and also pedestrians), docks in the northwest part of Nevis at Cades Bay, and runs between there and Majors Bay on St. Kitts. The Sea Bridge ferry runs six times a day in each direction. For pedestrians there are no facilities of any kind at Majors Bay (no houses, no businesses, etc.), only a small wooden gazebo as shelter from sun or rain, and so, if you have not already arranged to be met at Majors Bay by car or taxi, you will have to enjoy Majors Bay for a couple of hours in its more or less wild state before taking the ferry back to Nevis.

== Airports ==
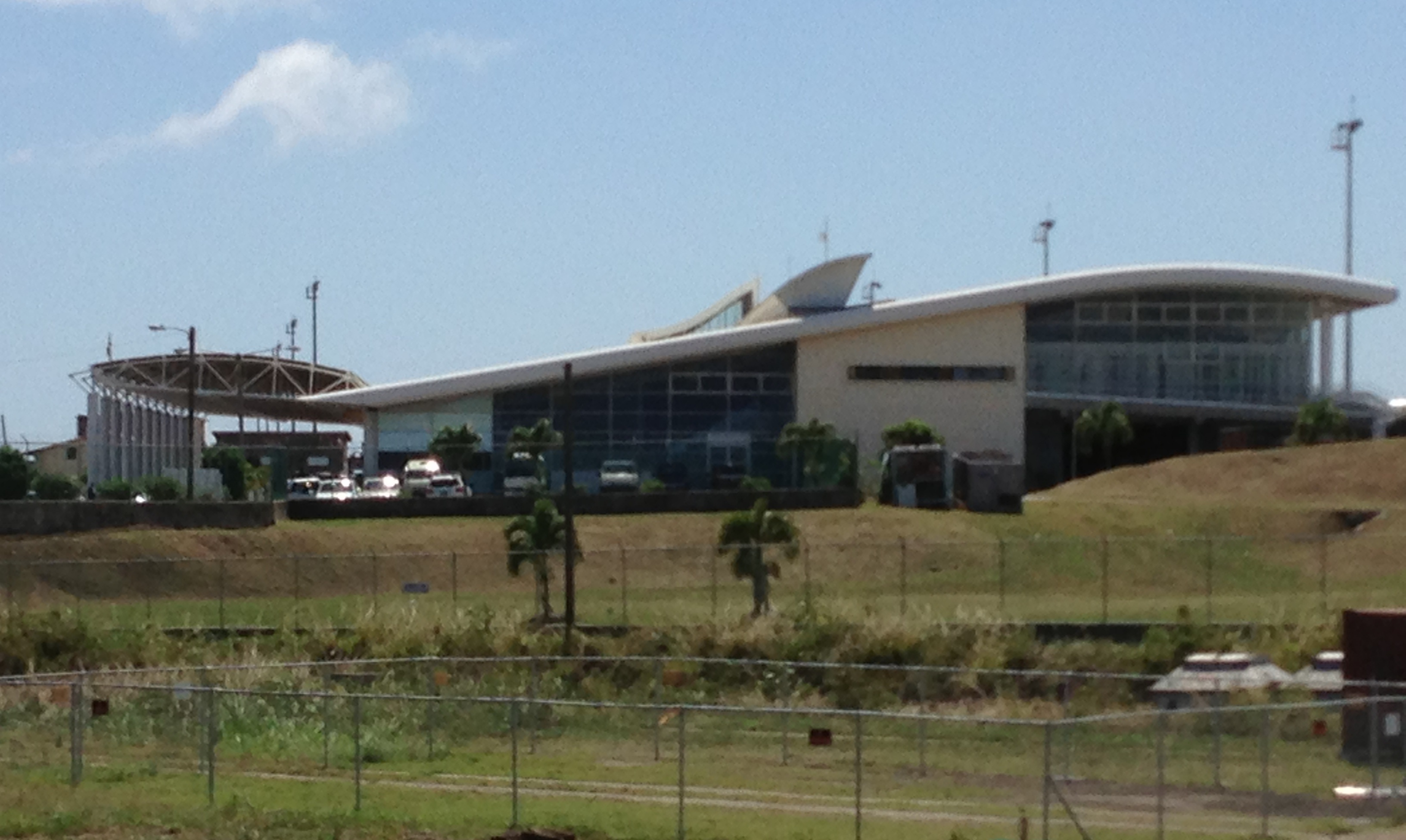
Robert L. Bradshaw International Airport

=== St. Kitts ===
The Robert L. Bradshaw International Airport (IATA airport code SKB/TKPK) serves the city of Basseterre, and by extension the island of Saint Kitts. The airport is located in the south of the parish of Saint Peter Basseterre on the north-eastern periphery of the city of Basseterre. The 8001-foot runway airport has direct flights to London, New York and Miami, and seasonal flights to Charlotte, NC, and Philadelphia, PA, in addition to other major cities in the US and Canada during the tourist season.

=== Nevis ===
The Vance W. Amory International Airport (IATA airport code NEV/TKPN) serves the island of Nevis. The airport runway is 4002 feet in length. Many flights connect from here to other Caribbean islands, including Puerto Rico.

== Railway ==
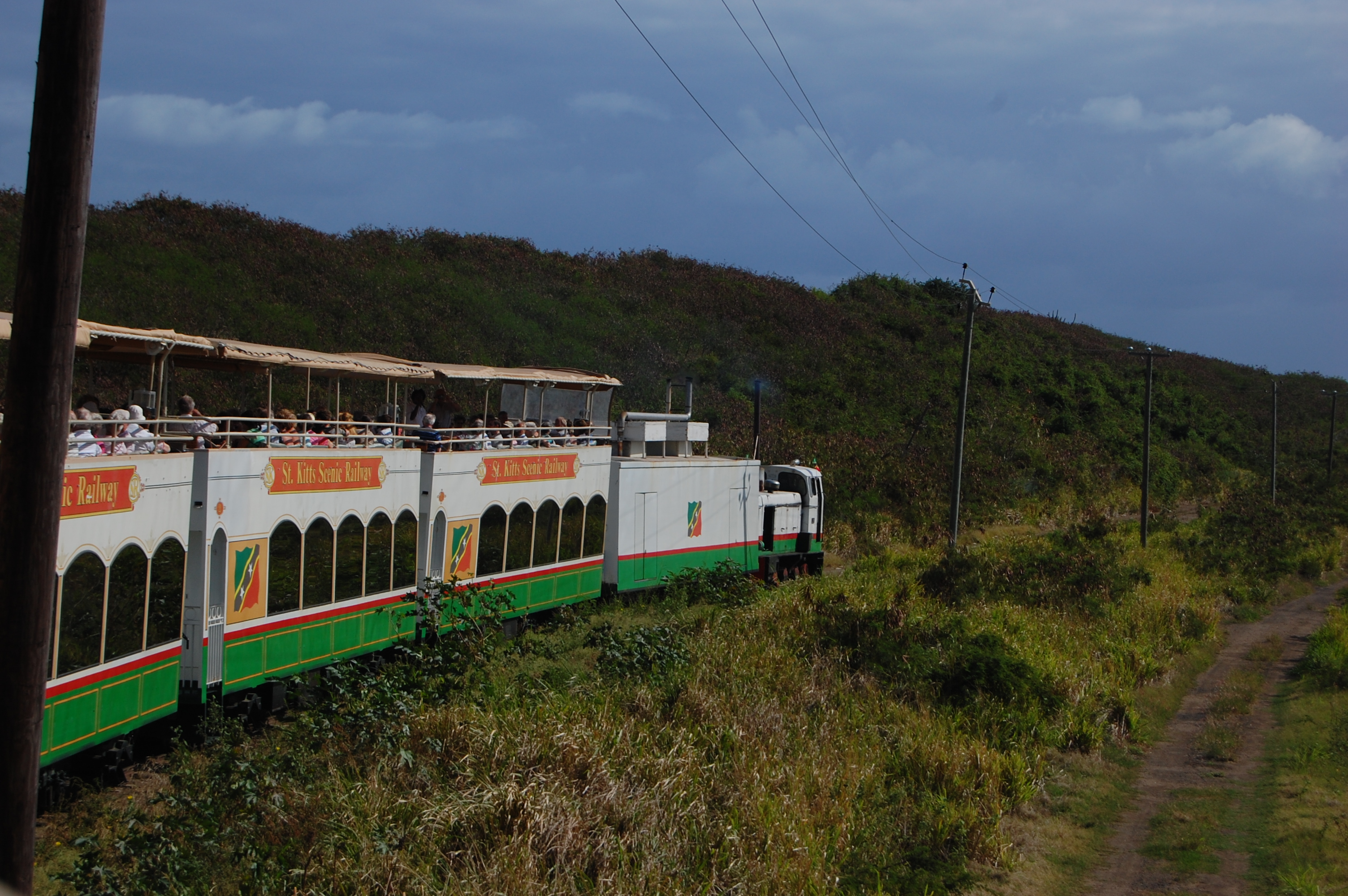
St. Kitts Scenic Railway

St. Kitts has a 29 km (18 mi) 2 ft 6 in (762 mm) narrow-gauge railway, which centres in the capital, Basseterre, and circles the island. The railway line was originally built between 1912 and 1926 to transport sugar cane to the central sugar factory in Basseterre. The last sugar cane load was delivered to the now-defunct factory in 2005. Since 2003 the railway has offered a circle tour of the island aboard specially designed open-air, double-decker coaches primarily for tourists. The St. Kitts Scenic Railway train currently runs from Sandy Point to Basseterre, travelling east.

== See also ==
- Saint Kitts and Nevis
