= Economy of Saint Kitts and Nevis =

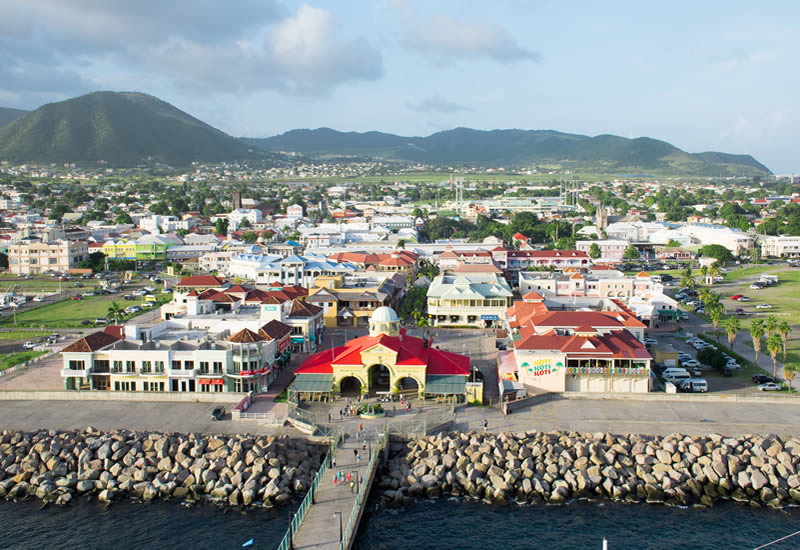
- Currency: East Caribbean dollar (XCD) (2.7 per US$ fixed rate since 1976)
- Fiscal year: 1 January – 31 December
- Trade organisations: CARICOM

Statistics
- GDP: ▲$1.134 billion (nominal, 2024); ▲$1.641 billion (PPP, 2018)
- GDP growth: 1.8% (2016) 0.9% (2017); 4.6% (2018) 3.5% (2019e)
- GDP per capita: ▲$17,513 (nominal, 2018 est.); ▲$29,323 (PPP, 2018 est.)
- GDP by sector: agriculture (3.5%), industry (25.8%), services (70.7%) (2001 est.)
- Inflation (CPI): −0.231% (2018)
- Population below national poverty line: NA
- Labour force: 18,172 (1995 est.)
- Unemployment: 4.5% (1997)
- Main industries: tourism, cotton, salt, copra, clothing, footwear, beverages, light manufacturing, component assembly for export

External
- Exports: $610 million (2018)
- Export goods: Low-voltage protection equipment, broadcasting equipment, measuring instruments, electric motor parts, electrical transformers
- Main export partners: Malta 48.7%; United States 21.1%; Turkey 6.56 (2023)
- Imports: $590 million (2018)
- Import goods: Refined petroleum, jewelry, ships, cars, poultry meats, cement
- Main import partners: United States 50.1%; Italy 10.5%; China 7.97% (2022)
- Gross external debt: $314 million (2004)

Public finance
- Foreign reserves: N/A
- Revenue: N/A
- Spending: N/A
- Economic aid: $3.52 million (recipient; 2005)
- Credit rating: N/A
- All values, unless otherwise stated, are in US dollars.

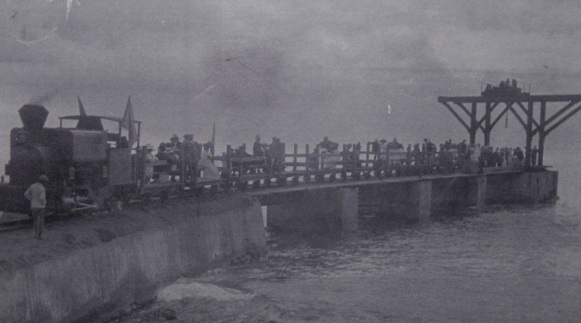
The St. Kitts 'Sugar Train' in 1912 used to transport sugarcane

The economy of Saint Kitts and Nevis has traditionally depended on the growing and processing of sugar cane; decreasing world prices have hurt the industry in recent years. Tourism, export-oriented manufacturing, and offshore banking activity have assumed larger roles in Saint Kitts and Nevis. Most food is imported. The government has undertaken a program designed to revitalize the faltering sugar sector. It is also working to improve revenue collection in order to better fund social programs. In 1997, some leaders in Nevis were urging separation from Saint Kitts on the basis that Nevis was paying far more in taxes than it was receiving in government services, but the vote on secession failed in August 1998. In late September 1998, Hurricane Georges caused approximately $445 million in damages and limited GDP growth for the year.

The economy of St. Kitts and Nevis experienced strong growth for most of the 1990s but hurricanes in 1998 and 1999 contributed to a sharp slowdown. Real economic growth was 0.75% in 2002 after a decline of 4.3% in 2001. The economy experienced a mixed performance during 2002, with some sectors experiencing positive growth while others experienced varying levels of decline. The construction sector recorded a 4.51% decline, manufacturing and hotels and restaurants also recorded significant declines of 4.01 and 9.89% respectively, and sugar production fell by 5.1%. Significant new investment in tourism, including a 648-room Marriott hotel and convention center that opened in December 2002, as well as continued government efforts to diversify the economy, are expected to improve economic performance. Consumer prices have risen marginally over the past few years. The inflation rate was 3–4% for most of the 1990s.

St. Kitts and Nevis is a member of the Eastern Caribbean Currency Union (ECCU) The Eastern Caribbean Central Bank (ECCB) issues a common currency (the East Caribbean dollar) for all members of the ECCU. The ECCB also manages monetary policy, and regulates and supervises commercial banking activities in its member countries. There is an extensive parallel economy denominated in US$, which is the de facto currency for many business transactions.

St. Kitts is a member of the Eastern Caribbean Telecommunications (ECTEL) authority, which is developing the regulations to liberalize the telecommunications sector in the region by 2004.

== Sectors ==
=== Tourism ===
According to the CIA World Factbook the main industry is tourism. Tourists, mainly Americans, come to the island via cruise ships (via Port Zante in Basseterre), air travel (via Robert L Bradshaw International Airport), and the private airport and private dock (for private yachts).

The tourism industry is unique in that it relies on both long term and short term visitors. Short term visitors are generally Americans, Canadians, and other CARICOM countries who come via cruise ship for the day or via Robert L Bradshaw airport for short term stay. Long term visitors are mostly Americans and Canadians that are staying for an average of 2.5-3 years on the island for vet school or medical school. The vet school on the island is Ross University School of Veterinary Medicine.

The tourism sector was badly hit by the effects of the hurricanes in 1998 and 1999. The country had just started to rebuild after Georges in 1998 when Lenny created substantial damage in 1999. The Port Zante complex, where the pier and terminal buildings are located, suffered serious damage. In Nevis, the only large hotel was forced to close for 6 months, resulting in lay-offs of staff (although many were employed to re-landscape devastated gardens) and decreased government revenue. Overall visitor arrivals, both of those staying over and those on cruise ship calls, fell about 15 percent in 1999, with a resulting decrease in visitor expenditure from the 1998 figure of US$75.7 million.

A unique point of interest is that the island of St. Kitts possesses the only remaining active railway in the West Indies. This was built to move sugarcane around, and part of the railway remains in use for tourist tours.

St. Kitts is also home to Brimstone Hill Fortress, a UNESCO world heritage site

=== Agriculture ===
Of the islands' total land area, about 39% is devoted to crops. The principal agricultural product of St. Kitts is sugarcane; peanuts are now the second crop. On Nevis, sea island cotton and coconuts are the major commodities. Sweet potatoes, onions, tomatoes, cabbages, carrots, and breadfruit are grown for local consumption on both islands, mostly by individual smallholders. In 2001, agricultural products accounted for about 18.5% of total imports by value and 11.2% of exports; the government has embarked on a program to substitute for food imports.

Sugar estate lands were nationalized in 1975, and the sugar factory was purchased by the government the following year. The output of raw sugar slumped between 1986 and 1989, and as a result the government entered into a management agreement with Booke and Tate of Great Britain in August 1991; a World Bank loan of US$1.9 million was utilized to provide financial stability. Sugar production in 1999 was estimated at 197,000 tons. Faced with a sugar industry that was finding it increasingly difficult to earn a profit, the Government of St. Kitts and Nevis embarked on a program to diversify the agricultural sector and stimulate the development of other sectors of the economy, particularly tourism. In July 2005, sugar production ceased.

=== Animal husbandry ===
Pasture areas are small, covering some 2.7% of the islands. Pangola and Bermuda grasses provide the bulk of the fodder. Estimates of livestock in 2001 were sheep, 14,000; goats, 14,400; cattle, 4,300 head; and pigs, 4,000.

=== Fishing ===
Fishing is a traditional occupation that has not expanded to any great extent; the catch in 2000 was 257 tons (down from 620 tons in 1990). Some exports (primarily lobsters) are made to the Netherlands Antilles and Puerto Rico; fisheries exports totaled US$245,000 in 2000. Fish is caught by traditional methods such as beach-seining, pot and trap fishing & hand-lining. The catch is not enough to satisfy local demand for fish. Large quantities of dried, salted and smoked fish, as well as frozen are imported from Canada and the United States.

=== Forestry ===
Both islands have small stands of virgin tropical forest, with palms, poincianas, and palmettos. About 11% of the land area consists of forests. Imports of forest products nearly reached US$1.8 million in 2000.

=== Mining ===
The mining sector played a minor role in St. Kitts and Nevis. No commercially valuable mineral deposits have been found on Saint Kitts. Hence mining and quarrying activities are limited to earthen materials. Presently, there is only one quarry on St. Kitts and multiple quarries on Nevis. Raking of salt, the country's fourth-leading industry, was done from time to time. Local quarrying of some materials was used to supplement the construction industry. In 2000, output for sand and gravel was 214,700 tons, up from 50,389 in 1996; crushed stone output was 121,226 tons.

=== Manufacturing ===
Industry accounted for 26% of GDP in 2001. The principal manufacturing plant and largest industrial employer is the St. Kitts Sugar Manufacturing Corp., a government enterprise; it grinds and processes sugarcane for export. The Carib brewery on St. Kitts makes beer for local consumption. Cotton is ginned and baled on Nevis. Electronic plants produce switches, calculators, car radios, and pocket radios. Other industries are clothing and shoe manufacturing. These provide a much-needed alternative to agricultural employment, particularly for women.

The manufacturing suffered a decline in 1998 due to Hurricane Georges. As a result of diversification and expansion, St. Kitts and Nevis has transformed small electronics plants into the largest electronics assembly industry in the Eastern Caribbean. Its apparel assembly industry has also become very successful in recent years. Garment manufacturing has expanded since the mid-1990s and now accounts for a large share of export earnings. Upgrading the Port Zante harbor complex in Basseterre enables large container ships to call, further enhancing St. Kitts' attractiveness as an offshore manufacturing base. Manufactured exports were valued at US$20 million in 1998 and 1999, suggesting that this sector was the least affected by hurricane damage.

There were four major industrial sites in St. Kitts and Nevis in 2000: C. A. Paul Southwell Industrial Park, Bourkes Industrial Estate, Canada Industrial Estate, and Prospect Industrial Estate. Port Zante is the main seaport.

== Statistics ==
Exports of Saint Kitts and Nevis by product category (2019) Chemical products Transportation Machines Mineral products Plastics and rubbers Metals Foodstuffs Precious metals Textiles Instruments Animal products Vegetable products Paper goods Footwear and headwear Miscellaneous Stone and glass Wood products Animal and vegetable bi-products Animal hides Arts and antiques Weapons

purchasing power parity - $726 million (2006 est.)

GDP - real growth rate: 6% (2007 est.)

GDP - per capita: purchasing power parity - $8,200 (2005 est.)

GDP - composition by sector: agriculture: 3.5% industry: 25.8% services: 70.7%(2001)

Inflation rate (consumer prices): 8.7% (2005 est.)

Labor force: 18,172 (June 1995)

Unemployment rate: 4.5% (1997)

Budget: revenues: $64.1 million

expenditures: $73.3 million, including capital expenditures of $10.4 million (1997 est.)

Industries: sugar processing, tourism, cotton, salt, copra, clothing, footwear, beverages

Electricity - production: 125 million kWh (2005)

Electricity - production by source: fossil fuel: 100% hydro: 0% nuclear: 0% other: 0% (1998)

Electricity - consumption: 116.3 million kWh (2005)

Electricity - exports: 0 kWh (2005)

Electricity - imports: 0 kWh (2005)

Agriculture - products: sugarcane, rice, yams, vegetables, bananas; fish

Exports: $42 million (1998)

Exports - commodities: machinery, food, electronics, beverages, tobacco

Exports - partners: US 61.9%, Canada 9.4%, Netherlands 6.6%, Azerbaijan 5% (2006)

Imports: $383 million (2006)

Imports - commodities: machinery, manufactures, food, fuels

Imports - partners: US 49.5%, Trinidad and Tobago 13.3%, UK 4.5% (2006)

Debt - external: $314 million (2004)

Economic aid - recipient: $3.52 million (2005)

Currency: 1 East Caribbean dollar (EC$) = 100 cents

Exchange rates: East Caribbean dollars per US dollar - 2.7 (2007), 2.7 (2006), 2.7 (2005), 2.7 (2004), 2.7 (2003)

Fiscal year: calendar year

== See also ==
- Minister of Finance of Saint Kitts and Nevis
