= List of rivers of Saint Kitts and Nevis =

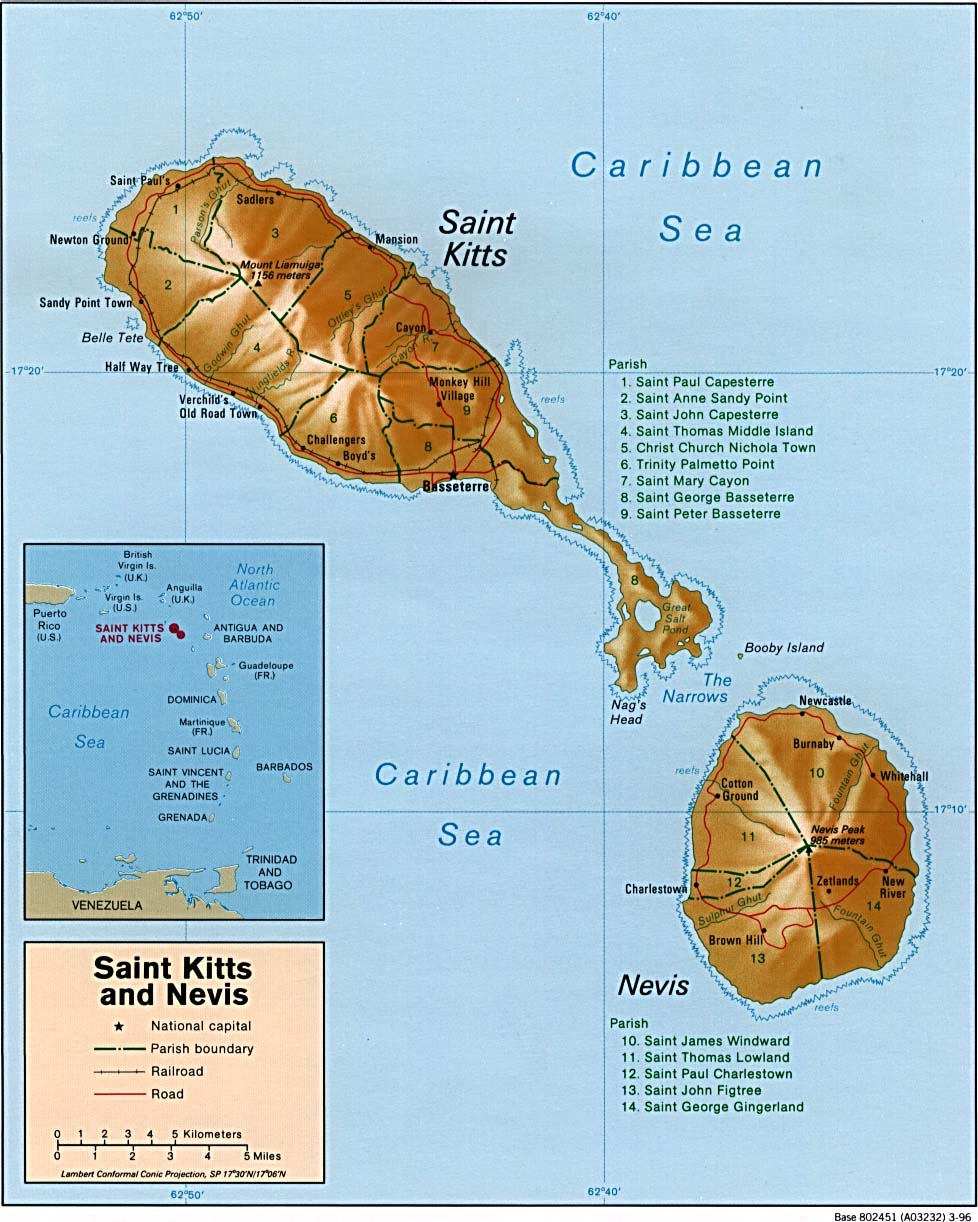
Map of Saint Kits and Nevis

This is a list of rivers of Saint Kitts and Nevis. Only Cayon and Wingfield are permanent rivers, all other rivers listed are intermittent. There are six permanent streams and 53 intermittent streams in Saint Kitts and Nevis.

== Saint Kitts ==
The following streams are located on Saint Kitts:

- Cayon, 17°21′19″N 62°43′19″W
- Christ Church Ghut, 17°22′59″N 62°45′17″W
- Cranstowns Gut (permanent stream), 17°22′52″N 62°51′47″W
- Fancy River (permanent stream), 17°18′00″N 62°43′00″W
- Lavingtons Gut (permanent stream), 17°24′24″N 62°48′03″W
- Lodge Ghut, 17°22′35″N 62°44′27″W
- Moliness Gut (permanent stream), 17°20′09″N 62°49′54″W
- Ottleys Ghut, 17°22′15″N 62°44′08″W
- Parsons Ghut, 17°24′40″N 62°48′16″W
- Pelhams (Stone Fort River), 17°18′12″N 62°47′19″W
- Wingfields River (permanent stream), 17°19′16″N 62°48′10″W

== Nevis ==
The following intermittent stream is located on Nevis:

- Camp, 17°12′26″N 62°34′47″W
- New River Ghut, 17°08′31″N 62°32′27″W
- Sulphur Ghut (permanent stream), 17°07′21″N 62°37′40″W
