= List of diplomatic missions in Saint Kitts and Nevis =

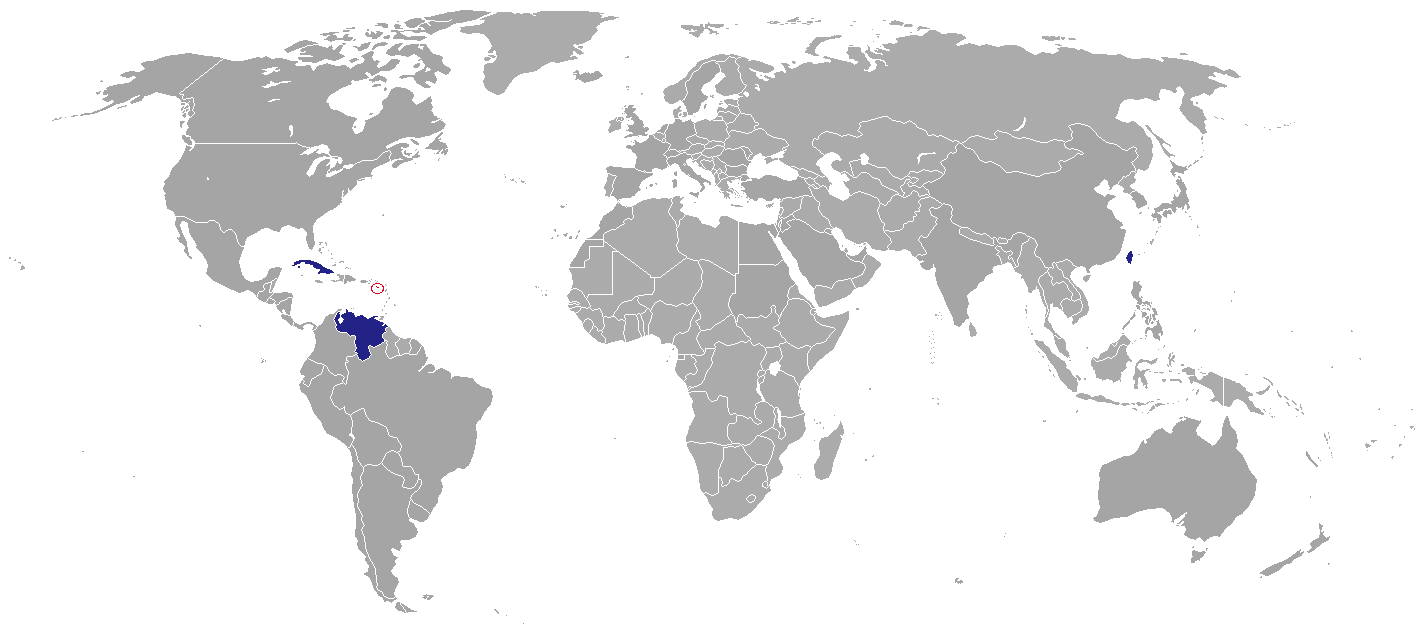
Diplomatic missions in Saint Kitts and Nevis

This is a list of diplomatic missions in Saint Kitts and Nevis. At present, the capital city of Basseterre hosts 3 embassies. Several other countries have honorary consuls to provide emergency services to their citizens.

== Embassies in Basseterre ==
1. Republic of China
2. Cuba
3. Venezuela

== Non-Resident Embassies/High Commissions ==
- Australia (Port-of-Spain)
- Algeria (Caracas)
- Argentina (Kingston)
- Austria (Bogotá)
- Belgium (Kingston)
- Bolivia (Santo Domingo)
- Brazil (Bridgetown)
- Canada (Bridgetown)
- Costa Rica (Santo Domingo)
- Colombia (Port-of-Spain)
- Denmark (Ottawa)
- Dominica (Roseau)
- Finland (Caracas)
- France (Castries)
- Germany (Port of Spain)
- Ghana (Port of Spain)
- Greece (Caracas)
- Guatemala (Port of Spain)
- Haiti (Santo Domingo)
- Indonesia (Bogotá)
- India (Georgetown)
- Iceland (New York City)
- Israel (Santo Domingo)
- Italy (Santo Domingo)
- Japan (Port of Spain)
- Kosovo (Panama City)
- Maldives (New York City)
- Marshall Islands (New York City)
- Malaysia (Caracas)
- Mexico (Castries)
- Nauru (New York City)
- Nicaragua (Santo Domingo)
- Netherlands (Port of Spain)
- Poland (Bogotá)
- Peru (Santo Domingo)
- Panama (Santo Domingo)
- Qatar (Santo Domingo)
- Russia (Kingston)
- Sahrawi Republic (New York City)
- Seychelles (New York City)
- South Africa (Kingston)
- South Korea (Santo Domingo)
- Spain (Kingston)
- Sweden (Stockholm)
- Switzerland (Santo Domingo)
- Thailand (Ottawa)
- Turkey (Santo Domingo)
- United Arab Emirates (Bogotá)
- United Kingdom (Bridgetown)
- United States (Bridgetown)
- Zimbabwe (Ottawa)

=== In Washington, D.C. ===
- Benin
- Brunei
- Central African Republic
- Estonia
- Ireland
- Jordan
- Latvia
- Lesotho
- Lithuania
- Malawi
- Mauritius
- Nepal
- Oman
- Philippines
- Sierra Leone
- Sudan
- Senegal
- Somalia
- South Sudan
- Swaziland
- Turkmenistan
- Togo
- Tajikistan
- Tunisia
- Uganda
- Zambia

=== In Havana ===
- Bangladesh
- Egypt
- Kenya
- Kuwait
- Libya
- Lebanon
- Laos
- Mali
- Morocco
- Norway
- Portugal
- Palestine
- Romania
- Saudi Arabia
- Timor Leste
- Uzbekistan
- Vietnam
- Yemen

== Former Embassy ==
- Brazil (Note: Resident in Bridgetown, Saint Michael, Barbados)
