= .kn =

Internet country code top-level domain for Saint Kitts and Nevis

- Introduced: 3 September 1991
- TLD type: Country code top-level domain
- Status: Active
- Registry: St. Kitts-Nevis Network Information Centre (KNNIC)
- Sponsor: University of Puerto Rico
- Intended use: Entities connected with Saint Kitts and Nevis
- Actual use: Gets some use in Saint Kitts and Nevis
- Registration restrictions: None except for some specialized third-level registrations such as those under edu.kn and gov.kn
- Structure: Registrations are made at second level, or at third level beneath several second-level names
- Documents: Rules
- Dispute policies: Parties with conflicts are expected to resolve them among themselves; registry will honor court orders
- Registry website: www.nic.kn

.kn is the Internet country code top-level domain (ccTLD) for Saint Kitts and Nevis. It is administered by the University of Puerto Rico, Central Administration.

== Second level domains ==
Registrations are allowed directly at the second level, and there are also some third-level registrations beneath these second-level names:

- .com.kn: Commercial (unrestricted)
- .net.kn: Networks (unrestricted)
- .org.kn: Organizations (unrestricted)
- .edu.kn: Educational institutions
- .gov.kn: Governmental institutions
