= Geography of Saint Kitts and Nevis =

Coordinates: 17°20′N 62°45′W

Map of Saint Kitts and Nevis

Saint Kitts and Nevis is a twin island country with a total landmass of just 270 square kilometres (104 sq mi). The island of St. Kitts, the larger of the two, is 180 square kilometres (68 sq mi) in size and is located at latitude 17.30 N, and longitude 62.80 W. Nevis is 93 square kilometres (36 sq mi) and located at latitude 17.10 N, longitude 62.35 W, approximately 3 km south-east of St. Kitts. The islands are about one-third of the way from Puerto Rico to Trinidad and Tobago. The islands are volcanic and mountainous.

== Geology ==
The island of St. Kitts is composed almost exclusively of volcanic rocks of andesite or dacite mineralogy. Its geology is similar to that of other volcanic islands in the Lesser Antillean Archipelago. The islands are the summits of a submerged mountain range which forms the eastern boundary of what is known as the Caribbean Tectonic Plate. St. Kitts is oriented northwest–southeast, about 80 km long and 16 km wide. The entire island archipelago is geologically young, having begun to form probably less than 50 million years ago, during the Miocene era. Volcanic activity occurred along the ridges of this arc during the Miocene era and has continued since.

Nevis is a volcanic island that began its formation in mid-Pliocene times (approximately 3.45 million years ago). However, the island comprises a number of discrete eruptive centers that range in age from mid-Pliocene to Pleistocene, these prevent any single model of the island's geological evolution. The geology of Nevis can be subdivided into four informal units: Volcanic of the eruptive centers, volcanogenic rocks - pyroclastics and lahars, fluviatile and lacustrine deposits, and raised beaches.

== Statistics ==
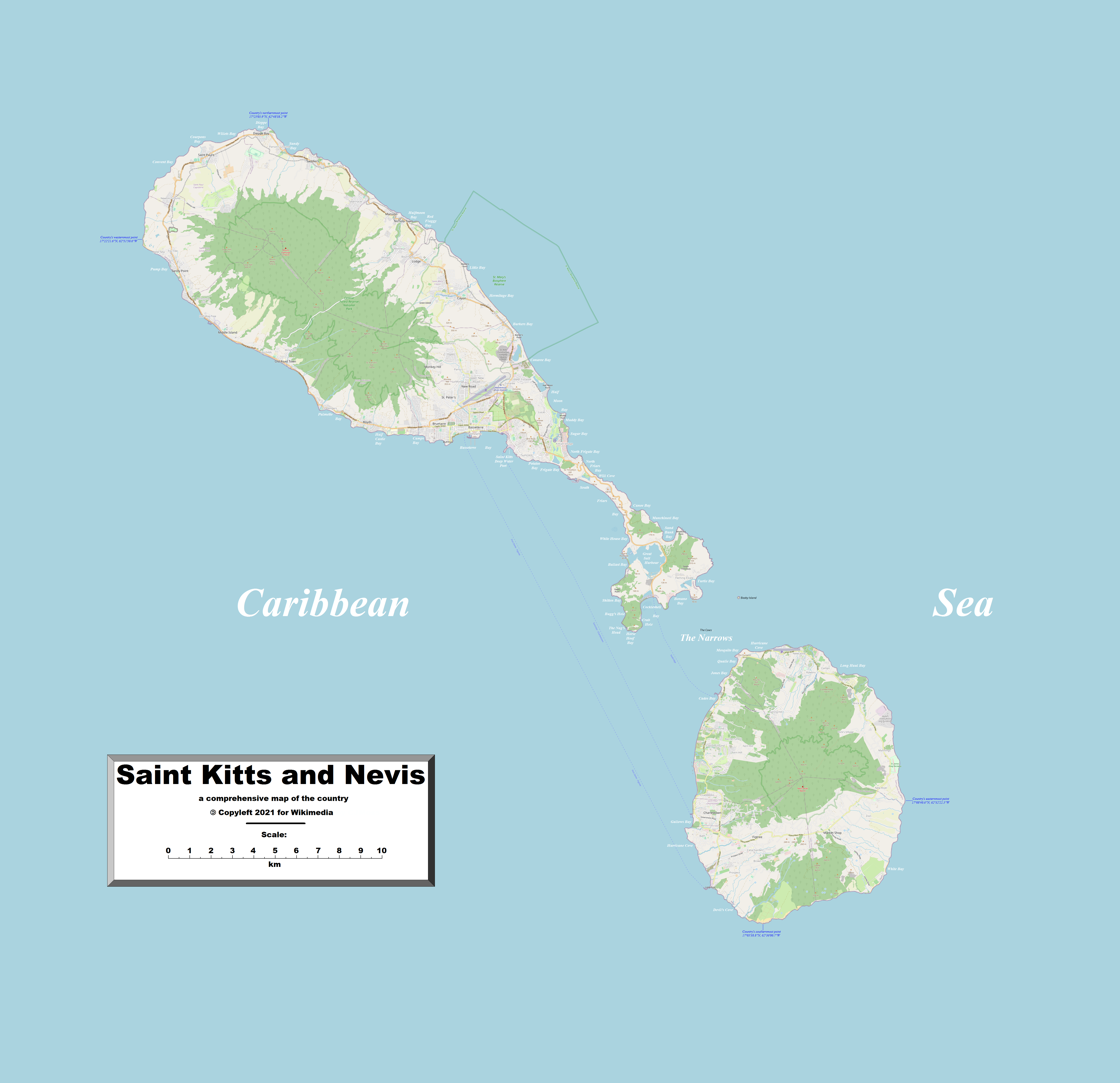
An enlargeable, detailed map of Saint Kitts and Nevis

Map references: Central America and the Caribbean

Area:
total: 261 km^{2} (Saint Kitts 168 km^{2}; Nevis 93 km^{2})
land: 261 km^{2}
water: 0 km^{2}

Area - comparative: two thirds the size of the island of Barbados

Coastline: 135 km

Maritime claims:
continental shelf: 200 nautical miles (370 km) or to the edge of the continental margin
territorial sea: 12 nautical miles (22 km)
contiguous zone: 24 nautical miles (44 km)
exclusive economic zone: 200 nautical miles (370 km)

Climate: tropical tempered by constant sea breezes; little seasonal temperature variation; rainy season (May to November)

Extreme points:

Northernmost point: Unnamed headland at Dieppe Bay Town, Saint Kitts

Southernmost point: Devil's Cave, Saint John Figtree Parish, Nevis

Westernmost point: Western cape of Saint Kitts, Saint Anne Sandy Point Parish

Easternmost point: Eastern cape of Nevis, Saint James Windward Parish

lowest point: Caribbean Sea 0 m

highest point: Mount Liamuiga 1,156 m

Natural resources: arable land

Land use:
arable land: 19.44%
permanent crops: 2.78%
other: 77.78% (2005)

Natural hazards: hurricanes (July to October)

Environment - international agreements:
party to: Biodiversity, Climate Change, Desertification, Endangered Species, Hazardous Wastes, Law of the Sea, Ozone Layer Protection, Ship Pollution, Whaling

== Climate ==
By the Köppen climate classification, St. Kitts has a tropical savanna climate (Köppen Aw) and Nevis has a tropical monsoon climate (Köppen Am). Mean monthly temperatures in Basseterre varies little from 23.9 °C (75.0 °F) to 26.6 °C (79.9 °F). Yearly rainfall is approximately 2,400 millimetres (90 in), although it has varied from 1,356 millimetres (53.4 in) to 3,183 millimetres (125.3 in) in the period 1901–2015.

Climate data for Saint Kitts and Nevis (1991–2015)
Month	Jan	Feb	Mar	Apr	May	Jun	Jul	Aug	Sep	Oct	Nov	Dec	Year
Daily mean °C (°F)	23.9 (75.0)	23.8 (74.8)	24.0 (75.2)	24.7 (76.5)	25.5 (77.9)	26.2 (79.2)	26.3 (79.3)	26.6 (79.9)	26.4 (79.5)	26.0 (78.8)	25.4 (77.7)	24.4 (75.9)	25.3 (77.5)
Average precipitation mm (inches)	150 (5.9)	102 (4.0)	99 (3.9)	153 (6.0)	219 (8.6)	181 (7.1)	214 (8.4)	232 (9.1)	222 (8.7)	289 (11.4)	286 (11.3)	225 (8.9)	2,372 (93.3)
Source: Climate Change Knowledge Portal

== Gallery ==
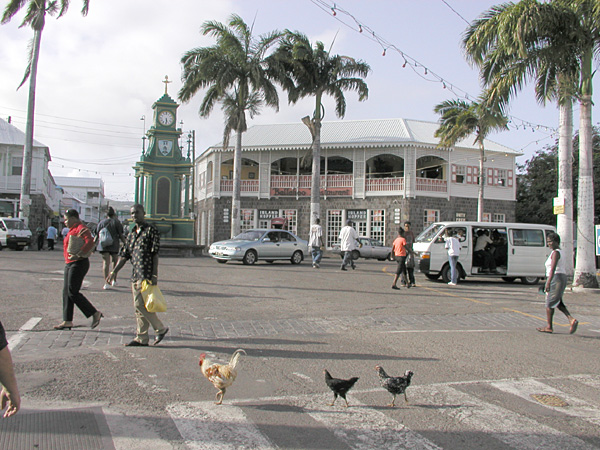
Downtown Basseterre

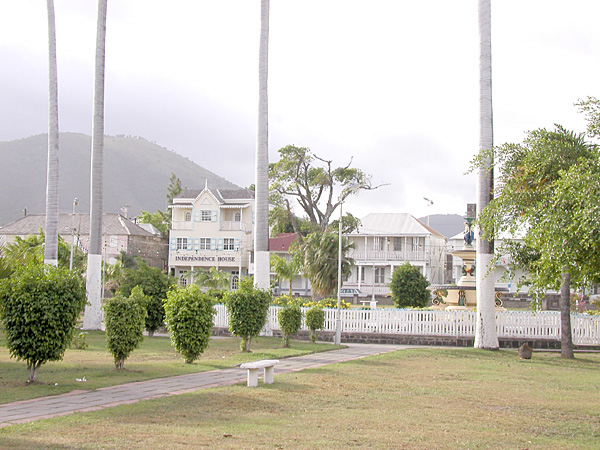
Downtown Basseterre

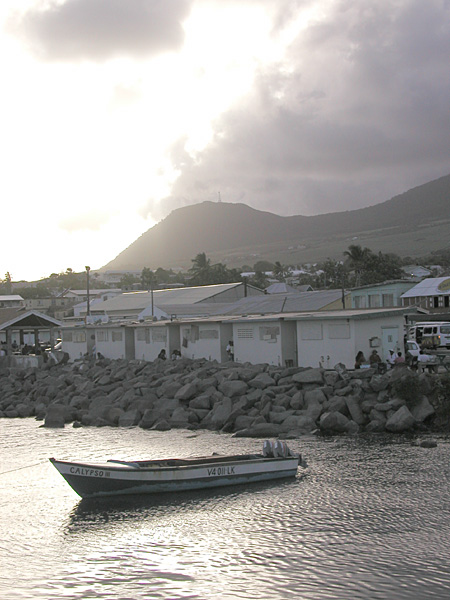
Fishing boat, Basseterre harbor

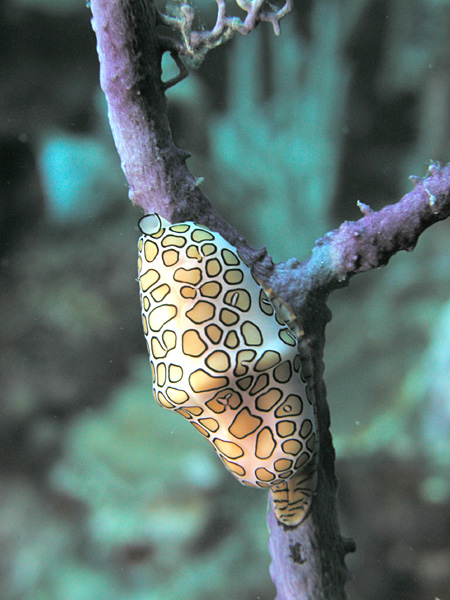
Flamingo Tongue shell on a Sea Fan

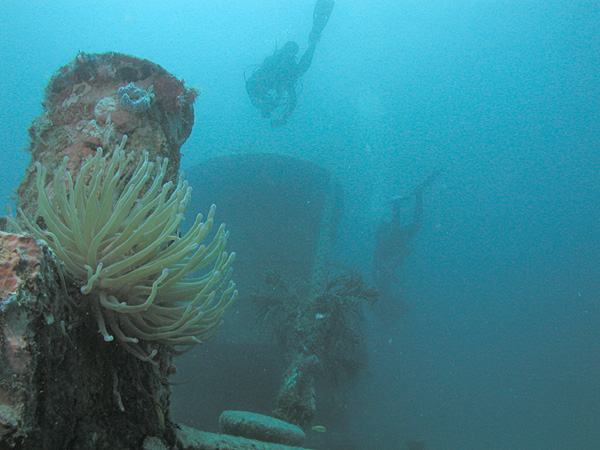
Divers and anemone on the MV River Taw wreck

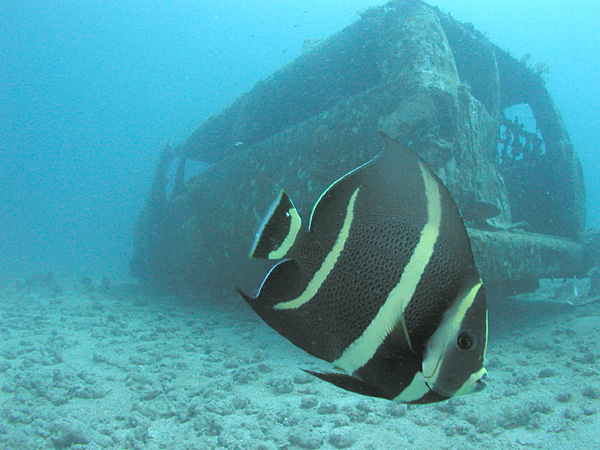
Juvenile French Angelfish near a sunken van

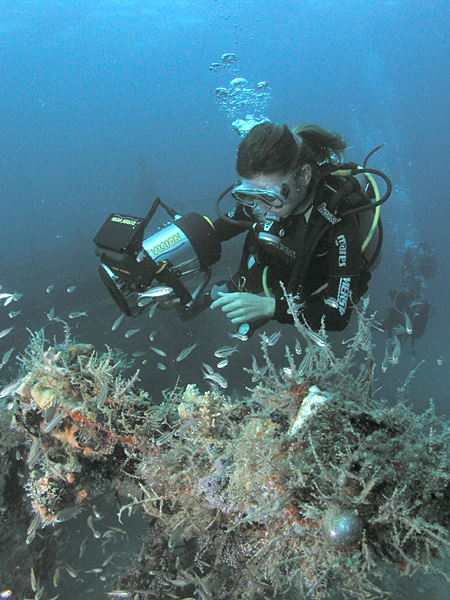
Diver and fish, MV River Taw wreck

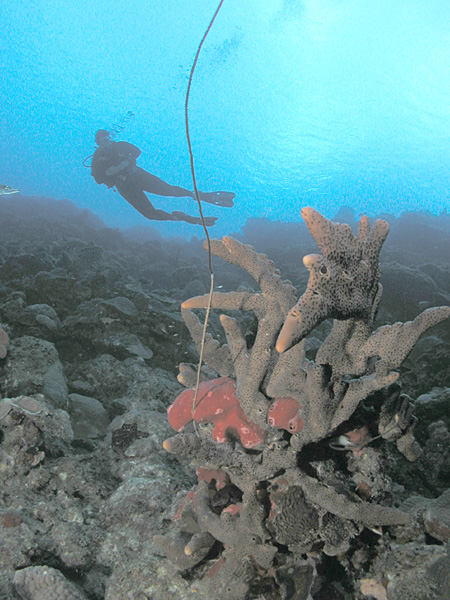
Diver and sponges

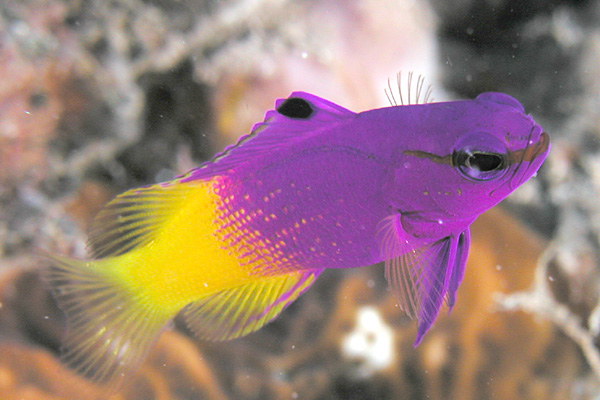
Royal Gramma or Fairy Basslet

== See also ==
- Saint Kitts and Nevis
