= List of museums in Saint Kitts and Nevis =

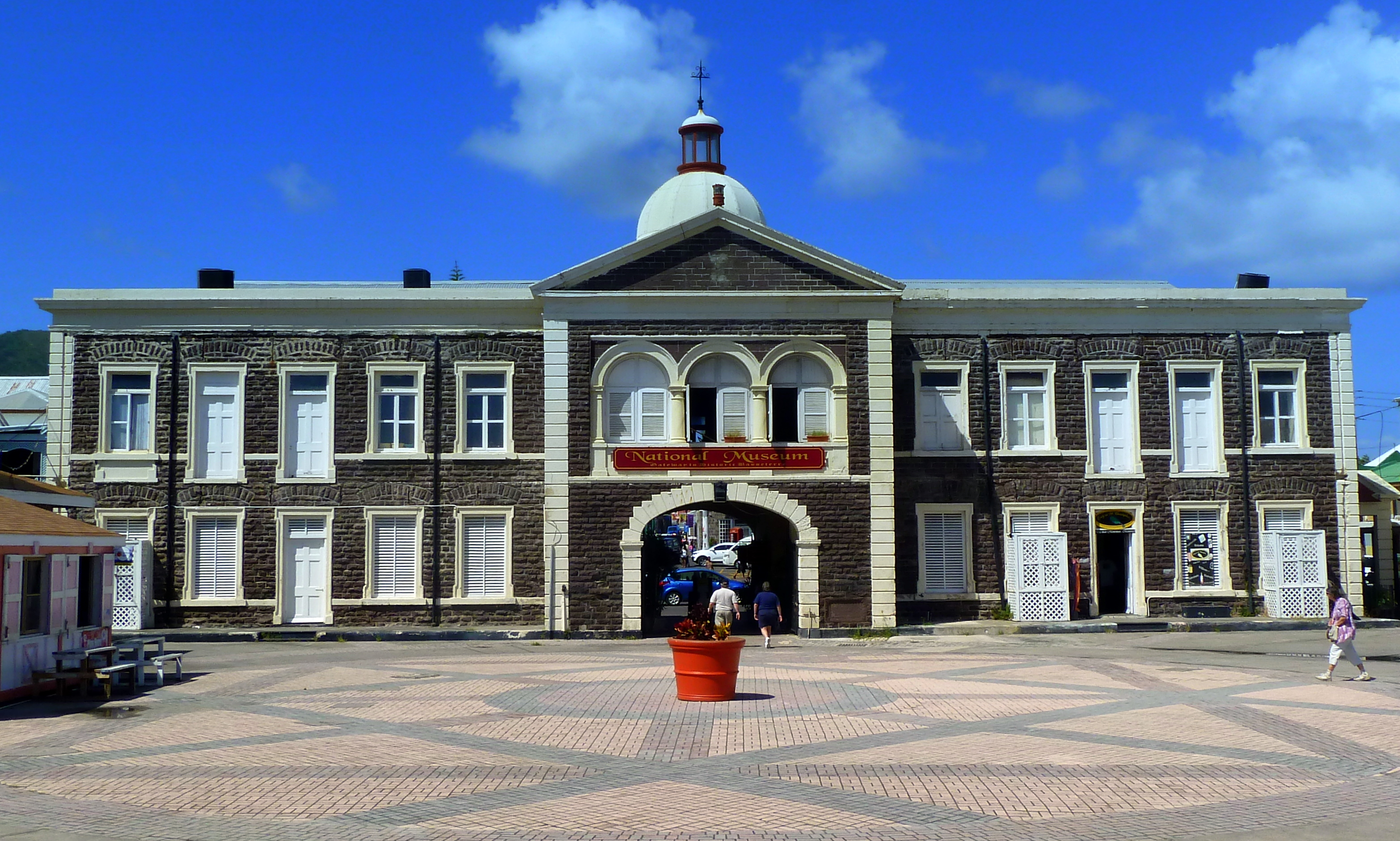
National Museum of Saint Kitts

This is a list of museums in Saint Kitts and Nevis.

- National Museum of Saint Kitts in Saint George Basseterre
- Nevis Historical and Conservation Society museums:

- Alexander Hamilton Museum
- Museum of Nevis History in Saint Paul Charlestown
- Joan Robinson Biodiversity and Oral History Resource Centre

== See also ==
- Saint Kitts and Nevis
