= Catholic Church in Saint Kitts and Nevis =

The Catholic Church in Saint Kitts and Nevis is part of the Catholic Church in communion with the Pope, Bishop of Rome.

== History and ecclesiastical organization ==
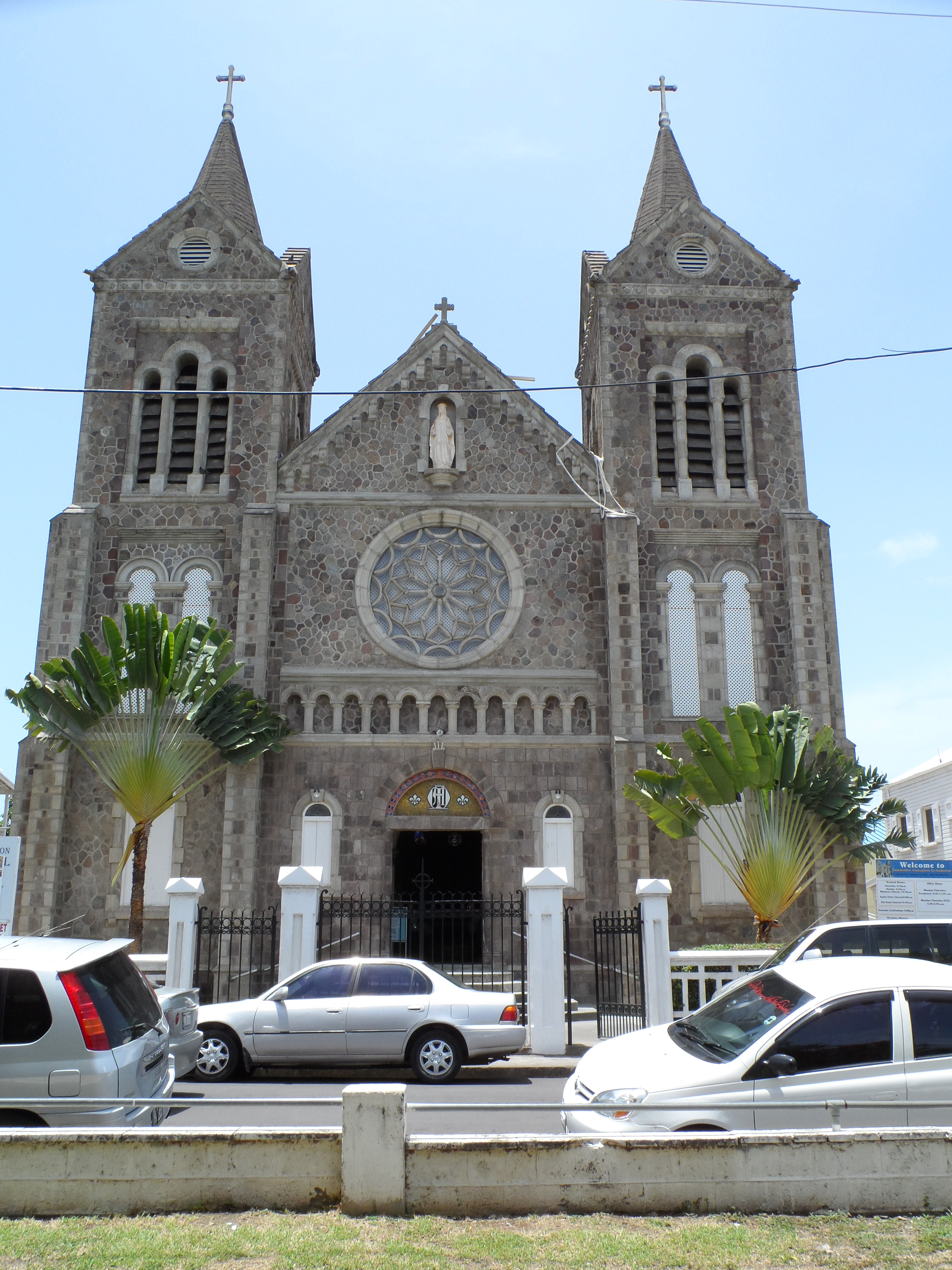
Co-Cathedral of the Immaculate Conception of the Virgin Mary

The state of Saint Kitts and Nevis includes the islands of Saint Kitts and Nevis. Catholicism began to flourish on the island of Saint Kitts during the nineteenth century thanks to Irish and Portuguese immigrants. In 1858 it was appointed the first parish priest, the priest Phillip Lynch. Today Catholics of Saint Kitts and Nevis belong to the Diocese of Saint John's - Basseterre, which has its headquarters in the city of Saint John's on the island of Antigua. In Basseterre, the capital of Saint Kitts and Nevis, is the Co-Cathedral of the Immaculate Conception of the Virgin Mary, built in 1856, and rebuilt in the years 1927 - 1928. In Saint Kitts there are two other parishes, the Holy Family and Sacred Heart. In the island of Nevis there is the parish of Santa Teresa. In total, there are four Catholic parishes in the nation.

== Apostolic Nunciature ==
The Apostolic Nuncio of Saint Kitts and Nevis was established on July 19, 1999.

== Nuncios ==
- Eugenio Sbarbaro (23 October 1999 - 26 April 2000 appointed Apostolic Nuncio to Serbia and Montenegro)
- Emil Paul Tscherrig (1 June 2001 - 22 May 2004 appointed Apostolic Nuncio to Korea)
- Thomas Edward Gullickson (2 October 2004 - 21 May 2011 appointed Apostolic Nuncio in Ukraine)
- Nicola Girasoli, from 29 October 2011
