= Museum of Nevis History =

Museum in Charlestown, Saint Paul Charlestown, Saint Kitts and Nevis

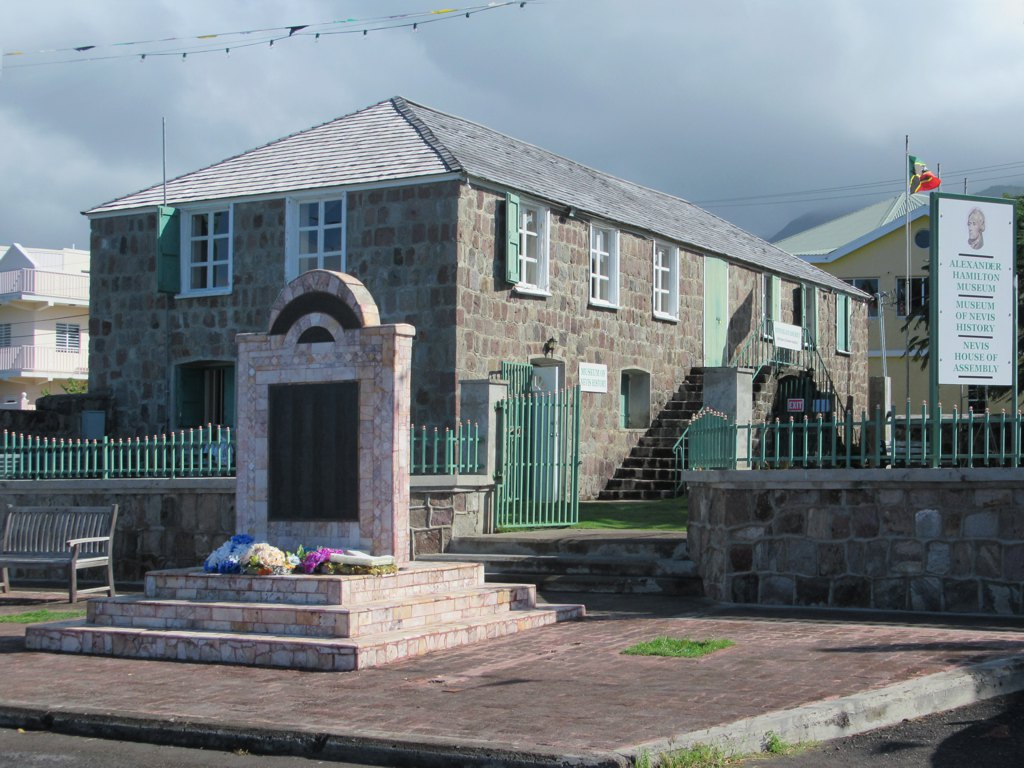
- Museum of Nevis History in December 2019
- Location: Charlestown, Saint Paul Charlestown, Saint Kitts and Nevis
- Coordinates: 17°08′28.2″N 62°37′46.7″W
- Type: museum

The Museum of Nevis History is a museum in Charlestown, Saint Thomas Lowland Parish, Saint Kitts and Nevis.

== History ==
The museum building was originally built around 1680. It was the birthplace of Alexander Hamilton, a Founding Father of the United States. In 1840, the building was destroyed during an earthquake. The building underwent restoration in 1983.

== Architecture ==
The museum is a two-story building. The ground floor houses the museum, and the upper floor houses the Nevis Island Assembly.

== See also ==
- List of museums in Saint Kitts and Nevis
- Nevis Historical and Conservation Society
