= St. William's Catholic Church =

St. William's Catholic Church may refer to:

- St. William's Catholic Church (Long Lake, New York)
- St. William's Catholic Church (Ramona, South Dakota), listed on the National Register of Historic Places listings in Lake County, South Dakota

== See also ==
- St. William's Church (disambiguation)
