= Christena disaster =

1970 ferry wreck between St. Kitts & Nevis

Coordinates: 17.2039°N 62.6480°W

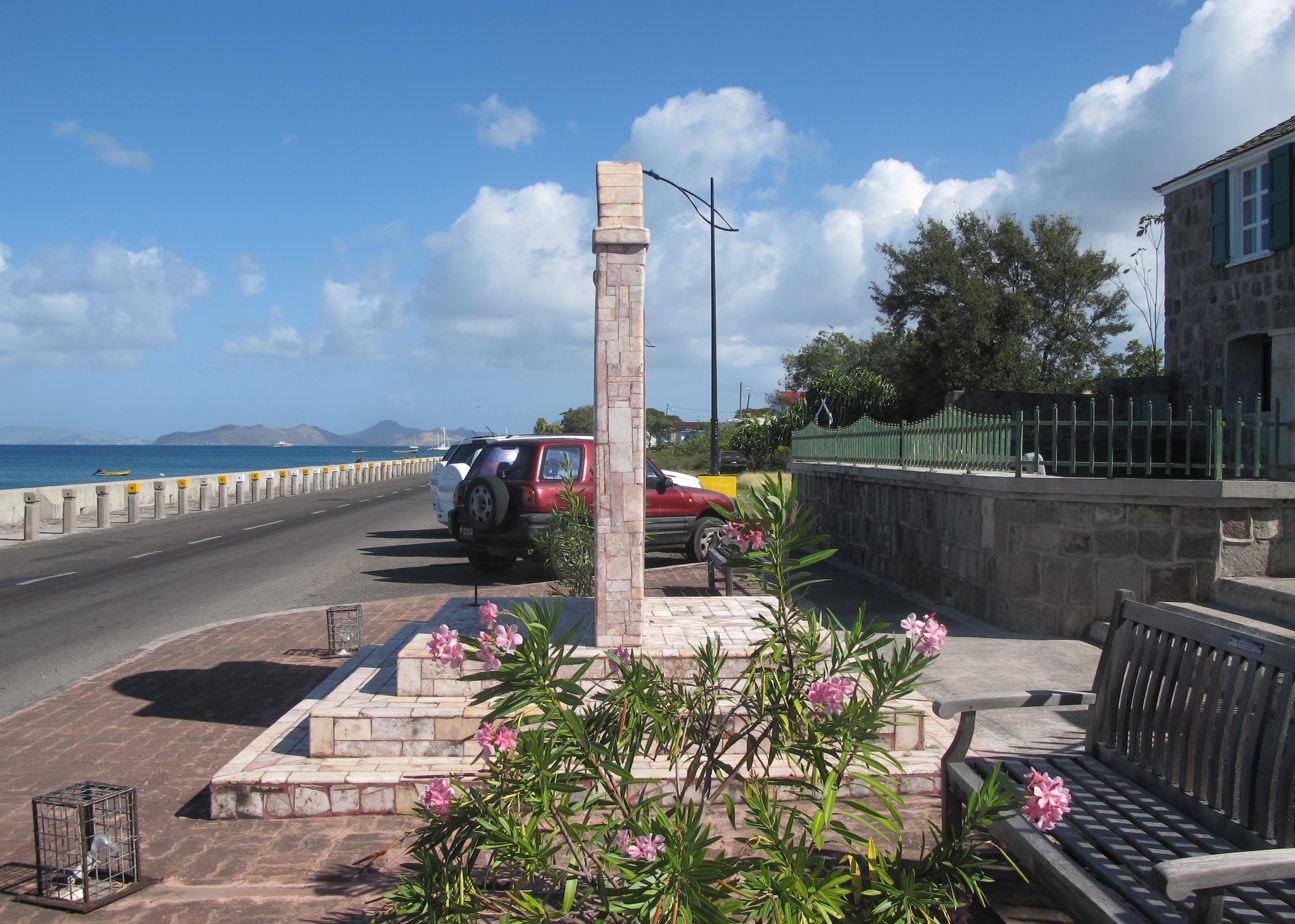
A view of the Christena memorial on the Charlestown waterfront on Nevis, looking north towards St. Kitts, with Nags Head in the distance on the left. The Alexander Hamilton House is partly visible on the right, 2014.

The Christena disaster was a ferry boat shipwreck with 233 casualties that occurred on 1 August 1970 in The Narrows, the strait between the islands of St Kitts and Nevis in the Leeward Islands, West Indies.

== Details ==
MV Christena was a 160 ft (49 m), government-owned and operated ferry, which for the previous 11 years had worked the 12 mi (19 km) Narrows route between Basseterre, the capital of the island of Saint Kitts, and Charlestown, the capital of the island of Nevis.

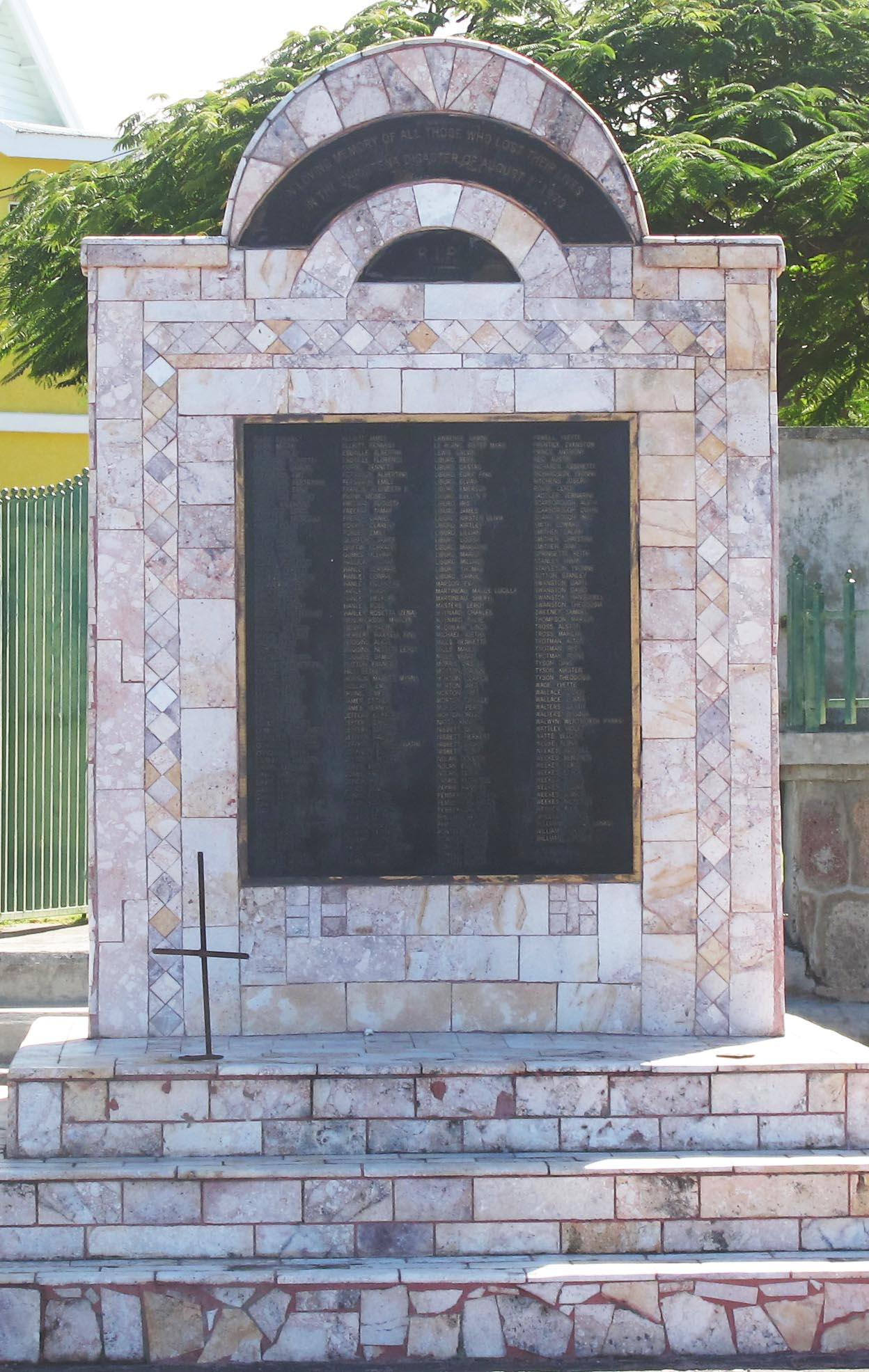
On the side facing the sea, the memorial lists 233 names of those who perished, 2014.

Christena had been built between 1958 and 1959 by Sprostons Ltd in Georgetown, British Guiana (present-day Guyana), and, at the time of sinking, had recently completed a refurbishment two months earlier at a dry dock in Bridgetown, Barbados. She was owned and operated by the Saint Kitts and Nevis Ministry of Communications, Works, and Transport, and constructed via an appropriation of $132,500 from the British government. Aside from being significantly overloaded on the day of the disaster, Christena left port with ballast tanks empty, a practice that had become standard procedure, to allow her to ride higher in the water and reduce complaints over waves soaking the decks, but which further compromised stability.

On the afternoon of Saturday, 1 August 1970 (the weekend of the annual Emancipation Day holiday), the ferry boat was overloaded on her final run of the day from St. Kitts to Nevis. The passenger capacity was 155, but that afternoon Christena had approximately 320 to 322 people on board. When the boat was .5 mi (0.80 km) off Nags Head (a promontory at the southern tip of the southeastern peninsula of St. Kitts), and entering the rougher seas that line up with the channel between the two islands, the ferry boat took on water because the captain could not close the hermetic doors of the ship. The captain abruptly turned his ship towards the coast in an attempt to run it aground, but the large, heavy ship capsized and in a matter of minutes it sank. Fishing boats came to help, but only 91 people survived, and the great majority of those were people that had to be rescued.

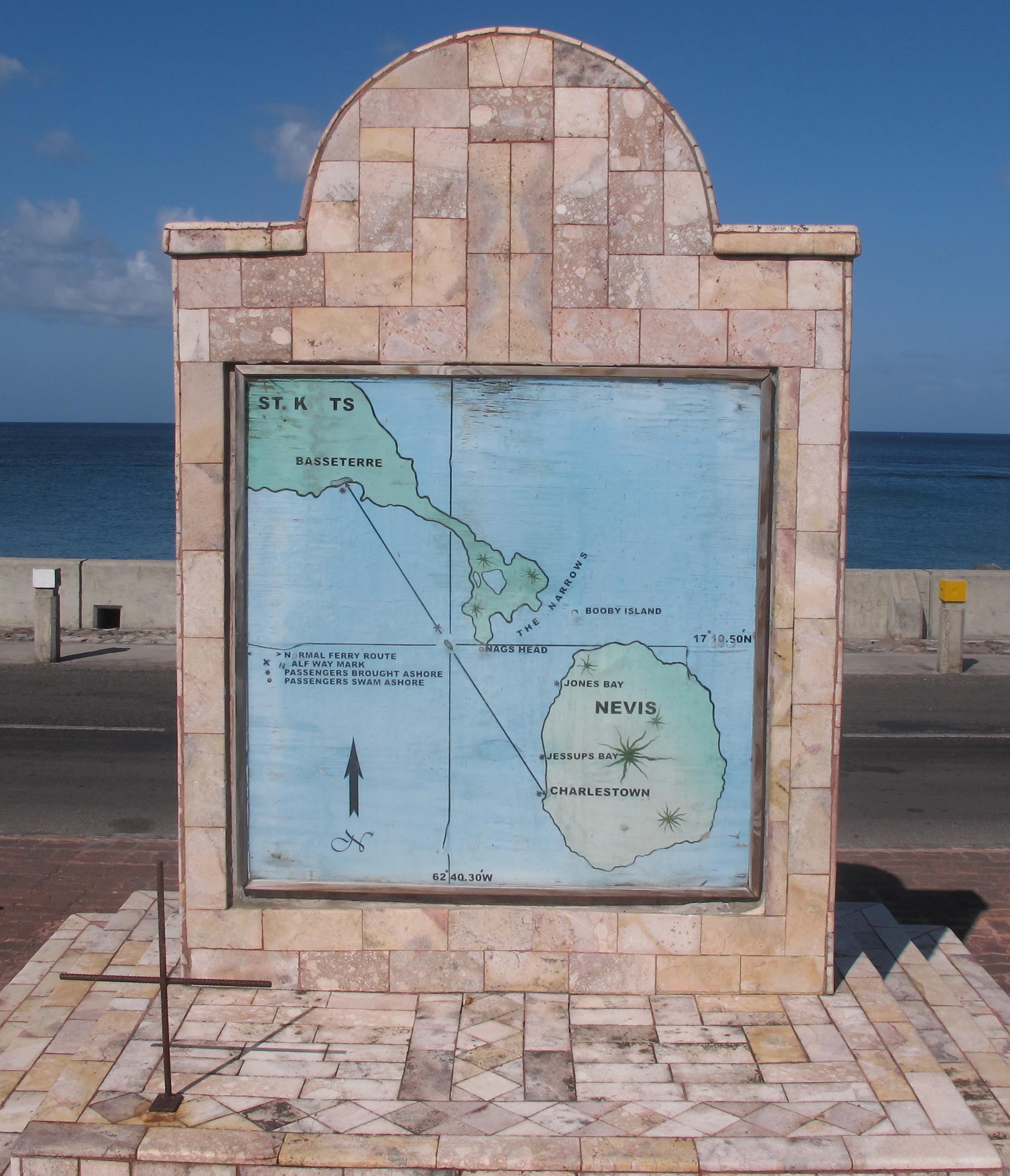
On the side facing inland, the Christena memorial features a map of the route the ferryboat was taking between St. Kitts and Nevis, 2014.

After the sinking, 57 bodies were retrieved and identified; 66 bodies were retrieved but were unidentifiable. A number of bodies were trapped inside the sunken wreckage, and these bodies were left in place: "A decision was made to leave the boat and [the entrapped] bodies undisturbed" notes Arthur Anslyn, Captain of the Caribe Queen, who was hired by the Commission of Inquiry to dive the site after August 1".

A memorial to the disaster is located on the waterfront in Charlestown, the capital of Nevis; that memorial reads: "In loving memory of all those who lost their lives in the Christena disaster of August 1st, 1970 R.I.P." A memorial headstone is located in the cemetery in the village of Bath on Nevis.

== Commentary ==
Oswald Tyson was one of the survivors of the disaster, and in his 2011 autobiography described Christena as "a two-decker, partly enclosed craft... she was in poor repair and she always took on water in the lower level. If I had worn shoes, the water would have ruined them as it came up to my ankles."

After the ferry boat sank, numerous injured people were in the water, and as Tyson explains: "...the blood attracted the sharks. They had never bothered anyone before, that I had heard of, but on this day the sharks came like monkeys to a mango tree."

== See also ==
- MV Barima – Guyanese passenger ferry that capsized in July 2026
