= St. Theresa Church, Charlestown =

Coordinates: 17.14312°N 62.62882°W

St. Theresa Church
- St. Theresa Church
- Location: Charlestown
- Country: Saint Kitts and Nevis
- Denomination: Roman Catholic Church

Administration
- Diocese: Roman Catholic Diocese of Saint John's–Basseterre

The St. Theresa Church and alternatively St. Theresa Parish, is a religious building of the Catholic church that is located in Main Road in the town of Charlestown, capital of Nevis Island and Saint Paul Charlestown Parish one of the 14 in the Caribbean and island federation of St. Kitts and Nevis in the Lesser Antilles.

This is one of the 3 existing Catholic churches on the island of Nevis being the other two dedicated to St. John Baptist de la Salle and the Immaculate Heart of Mary. Follow the Roman or Latin rite and is the main church on the island that depends on the Diocese of Saint John's - Basseterre (Dioecesis Sancti Ioannis Imatellurana) which was created in 1961 with the Bull "Cum nobis" of Pope Paul VI.

Members of the congregation are not only on the island but elsewhere in the Caribbean.

== See also ==
- Roman Catholicism in Saint Kitts and Nevis
