= NHCS =

NHCS may refer to:

- National Heart Centre Singapore
- Nevis Historical and Conservation Society
- New Hanover County Schools
