= Arthur Anslyn =

Arthur Anslyn MBE
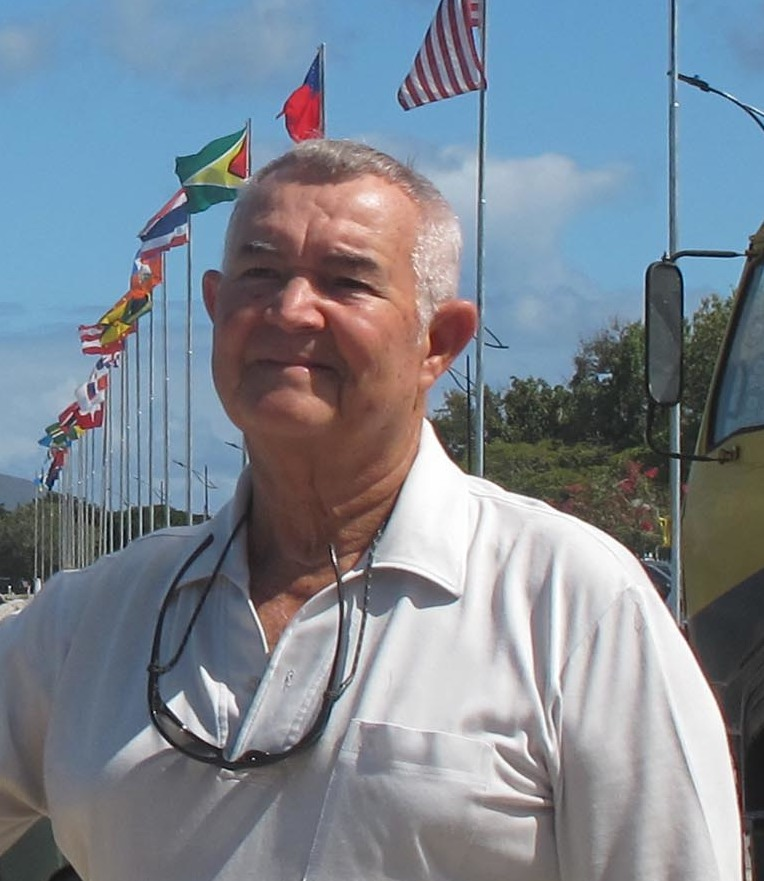
- Anslyn in 2014
- Born: Roy Arthur Anslyn; 23 December 1944; Nevis, West Indies
- Died: 7 October 2017 (aged 72); Nevis, West Indies
- Known for: marine expertise

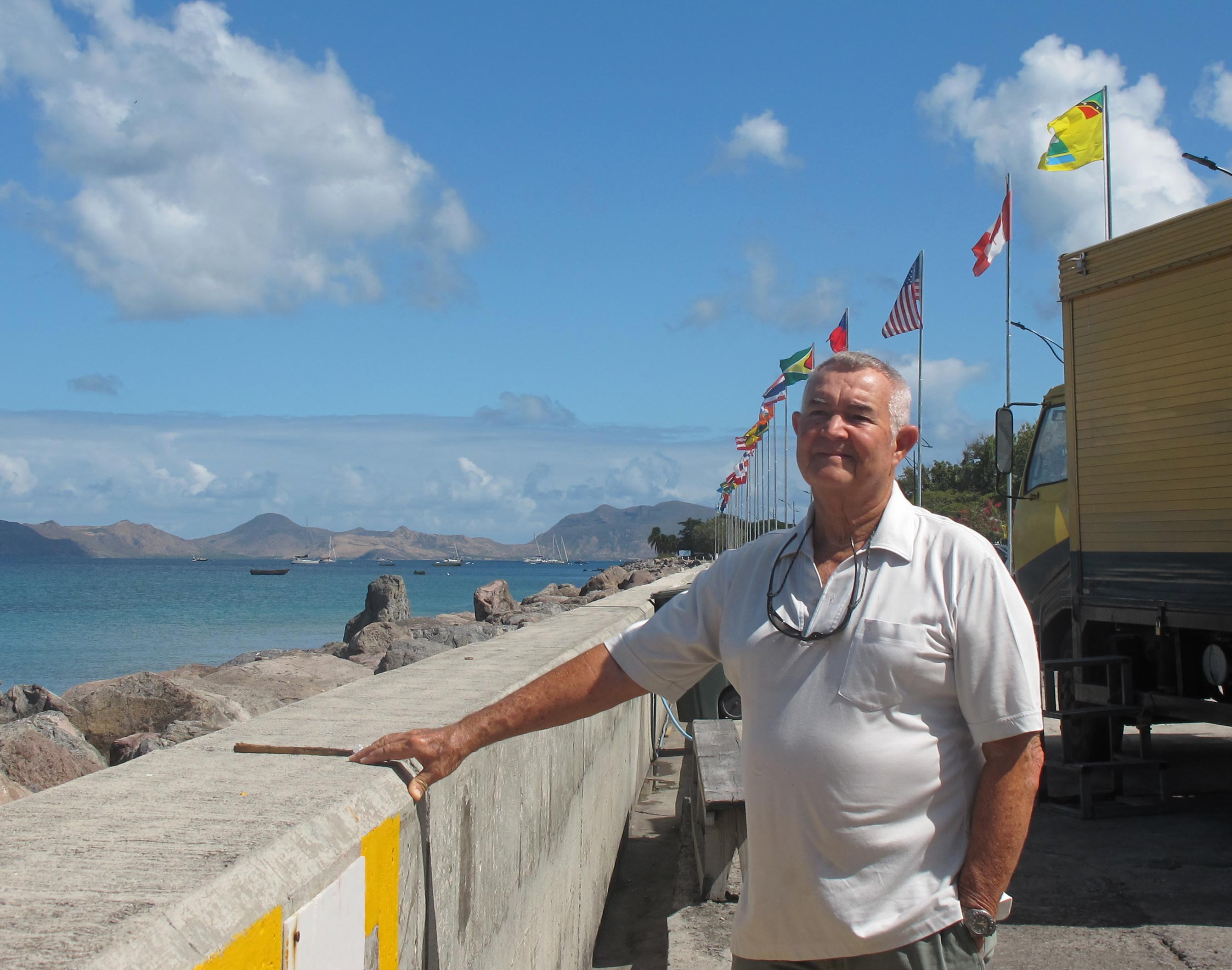
Captain Arthur Anslyn in 2014, on the waterfront next to the port, in Charlestown, the capital of Nevis, West Indies. Nevis flag flying in upper right of image. Southeastern Peninsula of the Island of St. Kitts visible in the distance.

Captain Roy Arthur Anslyn MBE (23 December 1944 – 7 October 2017), formally known as Arthur Anslyn or Captain Anslyn, and informally known as "Brother" Anslyn, was a recognized expert in marine knowledge who, from 1999 to his death, served as Marine Consultant to the Premier's Ministry, Nevis Air and Sea Ports Authority, Nevis Island Administration (NIA), and Marine Advisor to the Premier's Ministry, NIA. Over the years, Anslyn received numerous awards, both for his service to the community and for his bravery in saving lives and property in extreme situations.

Anslyn was born on the island of Nevis in the Federation of St. Kitts and Nevis, Leeward Islands, Lesser Antilles, West Indies.

Anslyn was honoured with the insignia of a Member of the Most Excellent Order of the British Empire in 1985. He was very active over the years in search and rescue, marine ambulance service, and other marine emergency services on Nevis. Using scuba, he took part in the underwater survey for the official inquiry after the 1970 Christena disaster, a ferry boat shipwreck which involved a great loss of life. Anslyn was captain of the Carib Queen ferryboat for 19 years, and was subsequently the Director of Fisheries at the NIA for many years. Anslyn was also an active member of Nevis Historical and Conservation Society.

Brother Anslyn lived in Charlestown, the capital of Nevis. His family name was originally Anslijn, of Dutch extraction: he had family ties to Saba, a Dutch island which lies north of Sint Eustatius.

In 1995, a reporter for the St. Kitts and Nevis Observer commented, "...he's one of those rare individuals who not only performs a public service...but also touch[es] the lives of so many of us" and, "We are fortunate to have someone like Brother among us".

== Overview ==
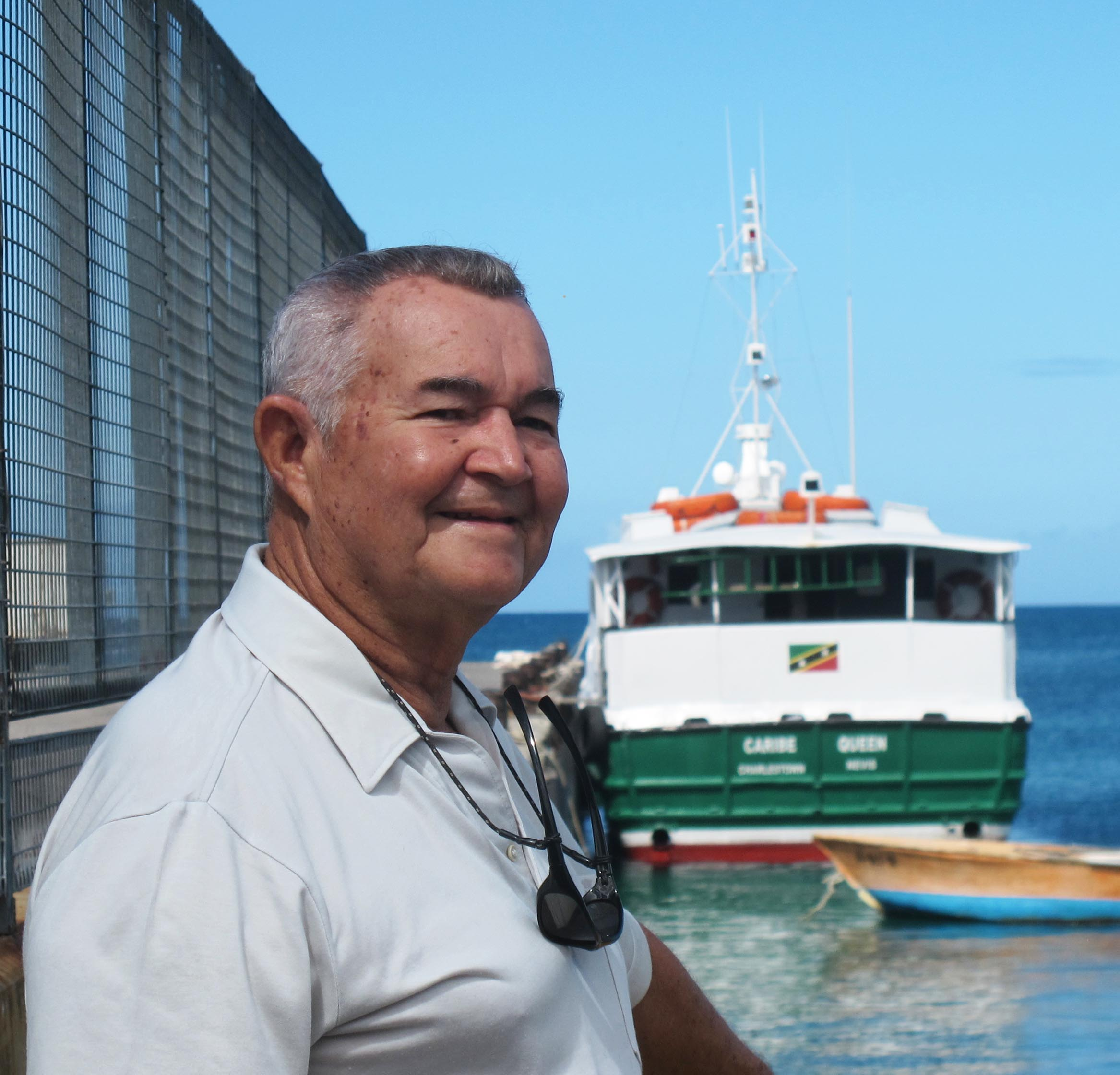
In 2014, Captain Arthur Anslyn standing at the port in Nevis with the stern of MV Carib Queen visible behind him; he was Captain of that ferryboat for 19 years.

Anslyn was an expert on marine matters. He was a highly experienced fisher and scuba diver. In 2000, Anslyn became Director of Fisheries at the NIA, a position which he held for many years. Anslyn also helped create and organize a Fishermen's Cooperative on Nevis.

For 19 years, from 1980 to 1999, Anslyn was Master of the Carib Queen, one of several St. Kitts and Nevis ferry boats. During this time period, Anslyn was given an award by the St. Kitts-Nevis Chamber of Industry and Commerce for his actions in saving the Carib Queen from being wrecked during the passage of Hurricane Klaus in 1984. The hurricane struck without prior warning while the Carib Queen was at dock in St. Kitts, getting an engine overhauled. As the storm intensified, Anslyn took the boat offshore, anchored it, and went and got one other crew member. They then both swam out to the boat, climbed aboard and rode the hurricane out at sea, with only one engine intact.

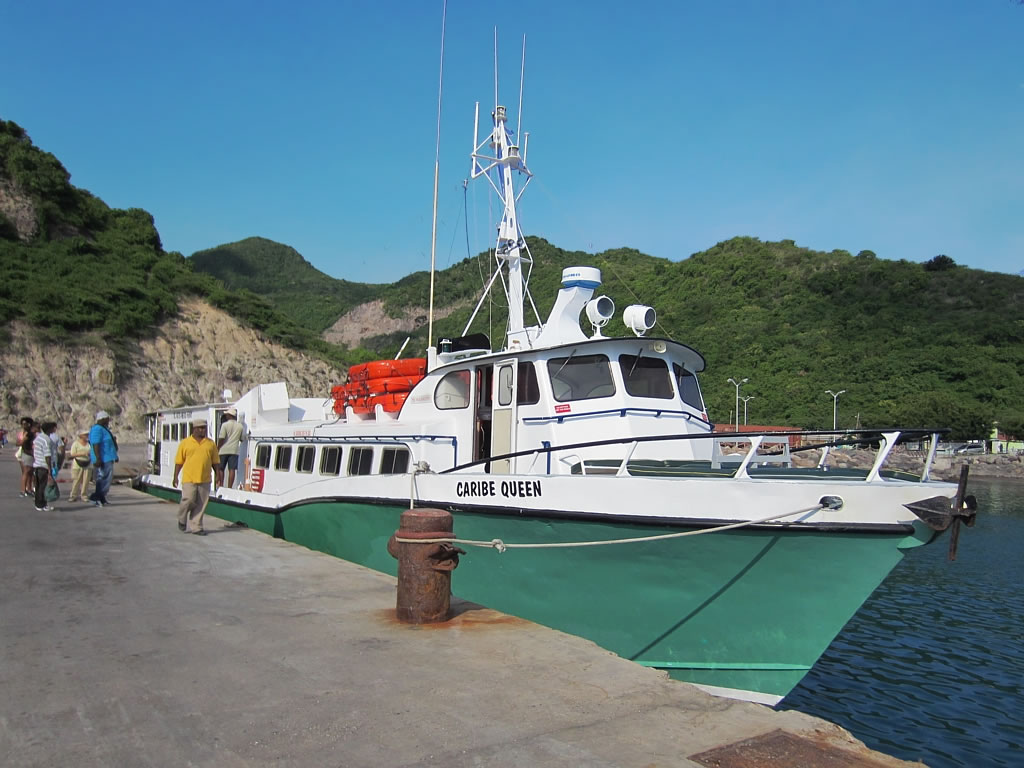
The MV Caribe Queen stopping at the island of Montserrat in 2011

In 1989, Anslyn once again saved the Carib Queen from destruction during the passage of Hurricane Hugo, by taking the ship to a slightly more sheltered area in Sint Maarten. Although he had successfully saved the Carib Queen, he subsequently found out that his own boat back on Nevis had been destroyed by the hurricane, which caused great damage to Nevis.

Anslyn piloted and worked on numerous sail boats and motor craft, both freight and passenger vessels, and studied marine topics at Woods Hole Oceanographic Institute and other marine science centers.

== History ==
=== Family background and influences ===
The paternal grandfather of Arthur Anslyn was Dr. Nicolas Anslijn, who was born in 1823 on the southern Caribbean Dutch colonial island of Curaçao, part of the Leeward Antilles. Nicolas Anslijn came north to the small Dutch colonial island of Saba as a government physician. He was a "pensioned officer of health of the first class" and was also made a Knight of the Order of the Netherlands Lion. His father had been a Dutch schoolteacher, also named Nicolas Anslijn, and his mother had been the daughter of a Venezuelan general who had fought alongside Simon Bolivar. At 54, after his first wife died, Dr. Nicolas Anslijn married 19-year-old Esther Zipporah Benjamin Hassell on Saba; they had two sons, Edward John Arthur Anslyn and William Carl Anslyn. In 1863, when slavery was abolished in the Dutch colonies, Nicolas Anslijn was the official who read the Dutch colonial emancipation proclamation in the settlement of Windwardside on Saba. He died during a visit to Sint Maarten, and was buried there at Little Bay.

Nicolas Anslijn's son, Edward Anslyn, moved to St. Eustatius, and from there to Nevis. For 24 years Edward Anslyn served as the Master of what was at first a mail boat, and subsequently a ferryboat, between St. Kitts and Nevis; the boat was named MV Anslyn in his honor. Edward Anslyn had a son and a daughter, Bronté and Roy Arthur, by Hopie, his first wife, who lived on Nevis.

Roy Arthur Anslyn, Edward's first son, was always informally known as "Brother" and more formally as Arthur (his second name) rather than Roy. Arthur followed in his father's footsteps by working on the sea and becoming a sea captain, although, as he commented in 1995, "My father always told me not to go to sea -- it's a hard life". Arthur Anslyn started working at sea in 1960; "I wanted to get lots of experience, so I went to work in the United States, Europe and throughout the Caribbean".

=== 1970 maritime disaster ===
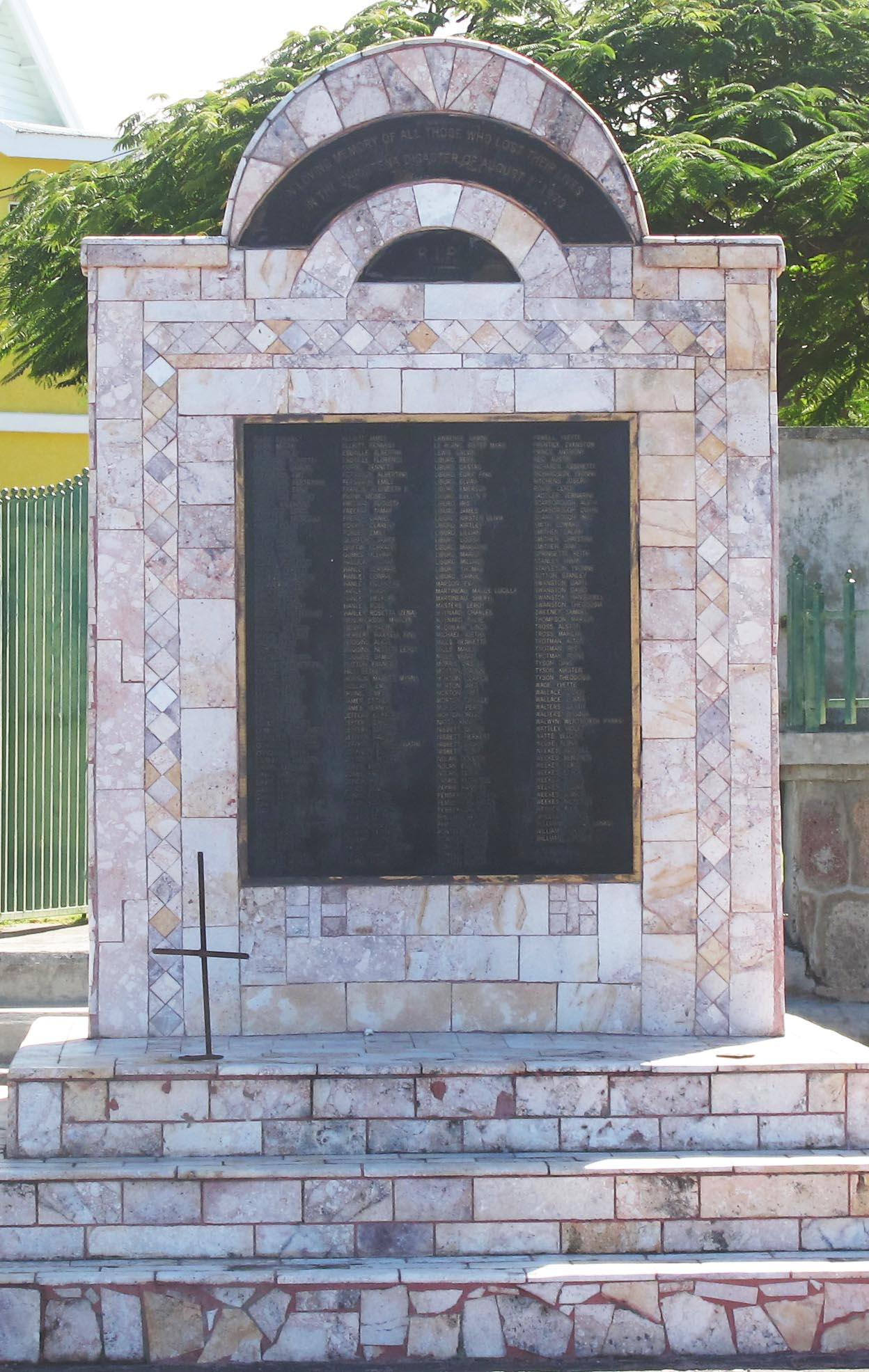
The Christena Memorial on Nevis includes a list of 233 names of those who perished.

Arthur Anslyn was off-island in Minnesota, USA, on 1 August 1970, at the beginning of the Emancipation Day holiday weekend, when the ferry boat MV Christina was traveling from Basseterre, St. Kitts to Charlestown, Nevis, on the last run of the day. The boat was greatly overloaded with passengers, with more than twice the recommended number of people on board, and halfway to her destination, she sank. Of the approximately 320 people who were on the Christina, only about 90 survived, nearly all of whom had to be rescued. Some bodies were retrieved almost immediately after the boat sank. As soon as Anslyn was back on-island, he was put in charge of scuba diving the wreck site using shark cages, in order to carry out the official survey of the disaster.

In total after the boat sank, 57 bodies were retrieved that could be identified, and 66 bodies were retrieved that were unidentifiable. Some bodies were trapped in the sunken wreckage; as was recounted in 1997: " 'A decision was made to leave the boat and [the entrapped] bodies undisturbed' note[d] Arthur Anslyn, Captain of the Caribe Queen, who was hired by the Commission of Inquiry to dive the site after August 1".

=== 1983 onwards ===
On 7 June 1983, as part of Caribbean Area Economic Policy Congresses, Anslyn took part in a three-day seminar on "Ocean Use and Resource Development and Management in the Eastern Caribbean", which resulted in published proceedings, Dalhousie Ocean Studies Programme, Dalhousie University.

On 2 March 1985, Anslyn received an award from the St. Kitts and Nevis Chamber of Industry and Commerce.

In the New Year Honours List published on Monday 30 December 1985, Anslyn was awarded an MBE, "For services to the community."

In a "Four Seasons Resort Nevis" activities guide, Anslyn was mentioned and described as: "Nevis’ most experienced fisherman, Captain Arthur 'Brother' Anslyn, who has over forty years experience, and is the mainstay of the local Fisheries Department."

In 1995, an account was published of one of Anslyn's rescues at sea, which took place in January 1991. A distress call came in from a woman: "Man overboard 20 miles SW of Nevis". In retrospect it became clear that, "[t]he names of the two people were Edwin Wolfe and Ruth Sarris, both Americans on the way from Antigua to Nevis, when the dinghy being towed broke away. In an effort to retrieve it Mr. Wolfe fell overboard and, fortunately, Miss Sarris threw him a lifeline". The weather was already bad and rapidly worsening, with large swells and strong wind. Anslyn went out in the Carib Queen to attempt a rescue. The weather was so bad by that point that another boat responding to the distress call was forced to give up and turn back. Anslyn managed to make radio contact, and the woman told him: "Hurry, hurry, please hurry, I am losing him." Anslyn managed to locate the vessel and had no choice but to jump overboard and swim out to the man, who was very weak at that point and physically unable to climb. Anslyn unlocked and unfolded the boarding ladder of the yacht, and managed to lift and hoist the man onto the deck. Three hours after the first distress call, both people were taken to the hospital on Nevis, and made a good recovery.

=== After 2000 ===
In 2001, when a French cruise ship ran aground on the coral reefs at the southeastern end of Nevis, the Montserrat Reporter quoted Captain Anslyn as telling a reporter from the Caribbean News Agency (CANA): "From the preliminaries, some of the coral was damaged and some of the anti-fouling paint was on the rocks, so we wanted to see if it was enough to cause any concern or to actually put in a claim or if there will be any long-term negative effects on the environment."

In 2004, Captain Anslyn (as Director of Fisheries) traveled to Norway with Nevis Premier Vance Amory; they met with Norway's Minister of Fisheries about plans to create a fish farm and fish processing plant on Nevis.

During the 2005 Disaster Awareness Week on Nevis, organized by the Nevis Disaster Management Office, Premier's Ministry, Captain Anslyn was given an individual award for search and rescue, as someone who has "greatly assisted in Disaster Management over the years".

In 2007-2008 Anslyn was listed as joint committee chairperson for Conservation and Biodiversity in the Nevis Historical and Conservation Society newsletter. In 2011-2012, Anslyn was listed on the NHCS website as Government Representative on the Executive Board.

In 2009, a newspaper article commented, "Brother has worked on the sea, above the sea, and very much for the sea", and "He has rescued people and boats without thinking of the risk to himself. He has built up knowledge of that massive underwater theatre by making it his life".

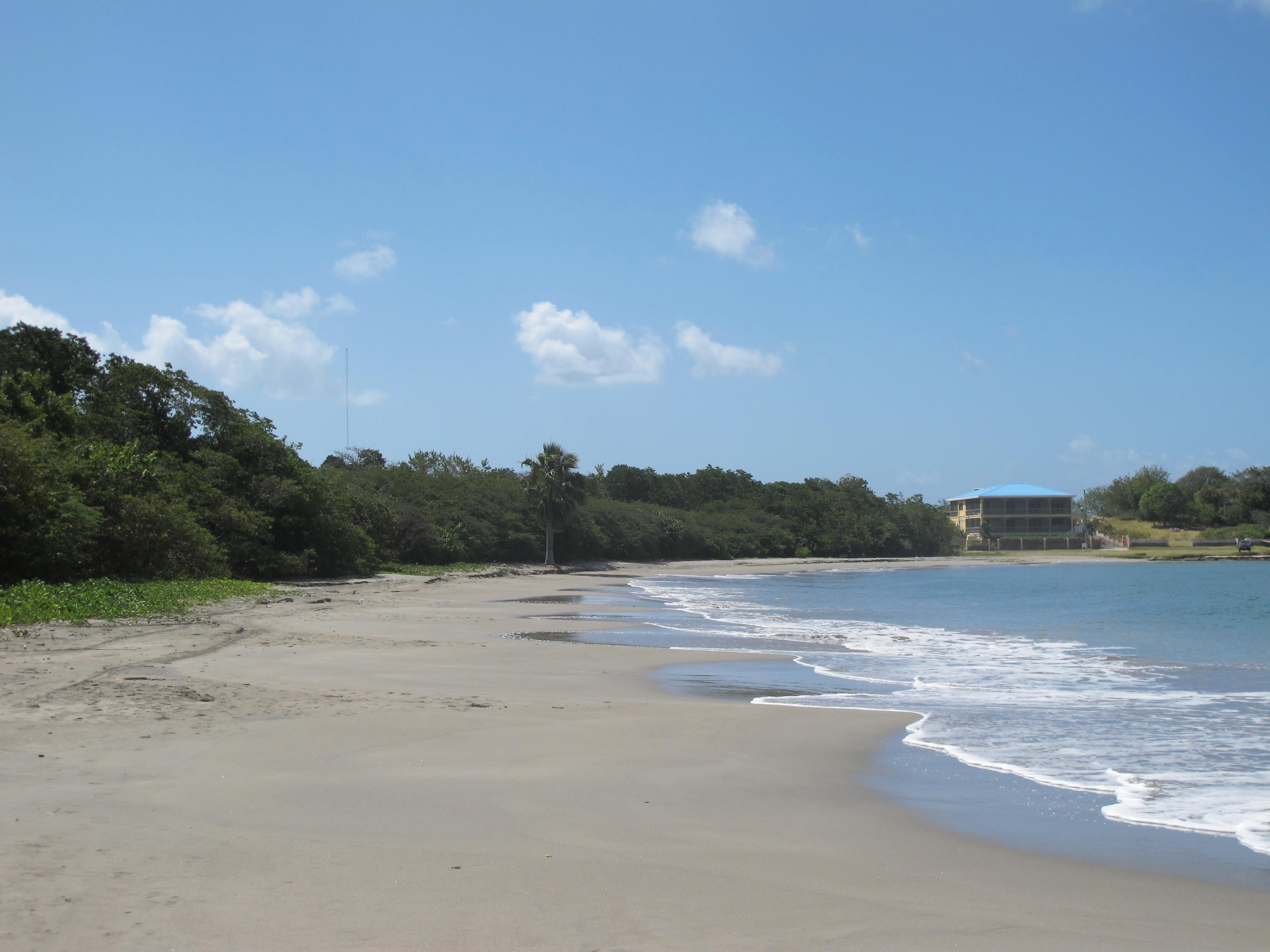
A view looking south along Gallows Bay on the island of Nevis, with the seaward edge of the Bogs (a large, privately owned, wooded marshland area) on the left. March, 2014

In 2012, on the government website, Captain Anslyn was described as "one of Nevis’ most experienced fishers" and "former Nevis Fisheries Director"; he expressed his support for the construction of Charlestown Community Fisheries Complex at Gallows Bay on Nevis. He commented, "[T]hat area is subject to heavy erosion. From what I have seen in my lifetime, two thirds of the area has gone to the ocean already" and also explained, "The construction of that facility will stop the erosion in that particular area. You will observe that the other areas further south of the project in Gallows Bay will be eroded. You won't be surprised to find that sooner than later the sea will be in the Bogs... When that happens it will be unfortunate, and this is something we can't stop. This is the work of Mother Nature and we just have to go along with it."

Also in 2012, in commentary on the proposed Japanese-sponsored Fisheries Complex, on KYSS 102.5 FM, a St. Kitts radio station, Captain Anslyn was quoted as saying, "Gallows Bay is the best setting" and "...we must look down the road to what the facility can do for the island, and all in all we will have to look positively to the future". In the broadcast Anslyn was described as a "veteran fisher" and "a leader in the fishing industry for decades".

Anslyn was interviewed as part of a book on the Caribbean politician Ivor Stevens, who was born on St. Kitts. The book was published in 2013.

Anslyn was one of the organizers of the "Great Lionfish Hunt" on Sunday 14 April 2013 on Nevis. This was an attempt to educate the public about this invasive species, and to encourage fishermen, consumers and hotels to exploit it as a food source. He commented, "The objective of the Great Lionfish Hunt is to reduce the amount of Lionfish on the island. We know we cannot eradicate them, so what we are trying to do is keep the numbers down". He also explained that "The toxic spines have nothing to do with the flesh; the flesh is perfectly safe to eat".

== Awards ==
In addition to the MBE honor and the award from the St Kitts-Nevis Chamber of Commerce and Industry for Outstanding Bravery during Hurricane Klaus, Anslyn received the following awards:

- 1985: St. Christopher and Nevis Independence Honours Award, for "Public Service"
- 1986: Anguilla-Nevis-St. Kitts Association Toronto, for "Outstanding Contribution to Country and Others"
- 1987: St. Kitts and Nevis Red Cross, "Contribution to the Society"
- 1994: Culturama Committee, for "Contribution and Service towards Culturama and its Programme"
- 1994: Nevis Island Administration, for "Contribution towards Tourism Development"
- 1994: Nevis Island Administration, "In appreciation of the development in trade between St. Kitts and Nevis"
- 1996: Nevis Island Administration, for "Outstanding contribution to the development of the Charlestown Port"
- 1997: Foundation for National Development FND, "In appreciation of the voluntary services given as a Trustee of FND"
- 1998: Alexandra Hospital, for "Unstinting dedication to the Institution over the years"
- 199?: Nevis Fisherman's Marketing and Supply Cooperative Society, for "Outstanding contribution to the Society"

== Publications ==
Published articles by Anslyn include:

- "Harvesting/eating parrotfish puts our coral at risk", by Capt. Arthur "Brother" Anslyn, NHCS Board Director, Friday 8 March 2013, St. Kitts & Nevis Observer, Commentary.
