= MV Barima =

Guyanese passenger ferry (built 1939)

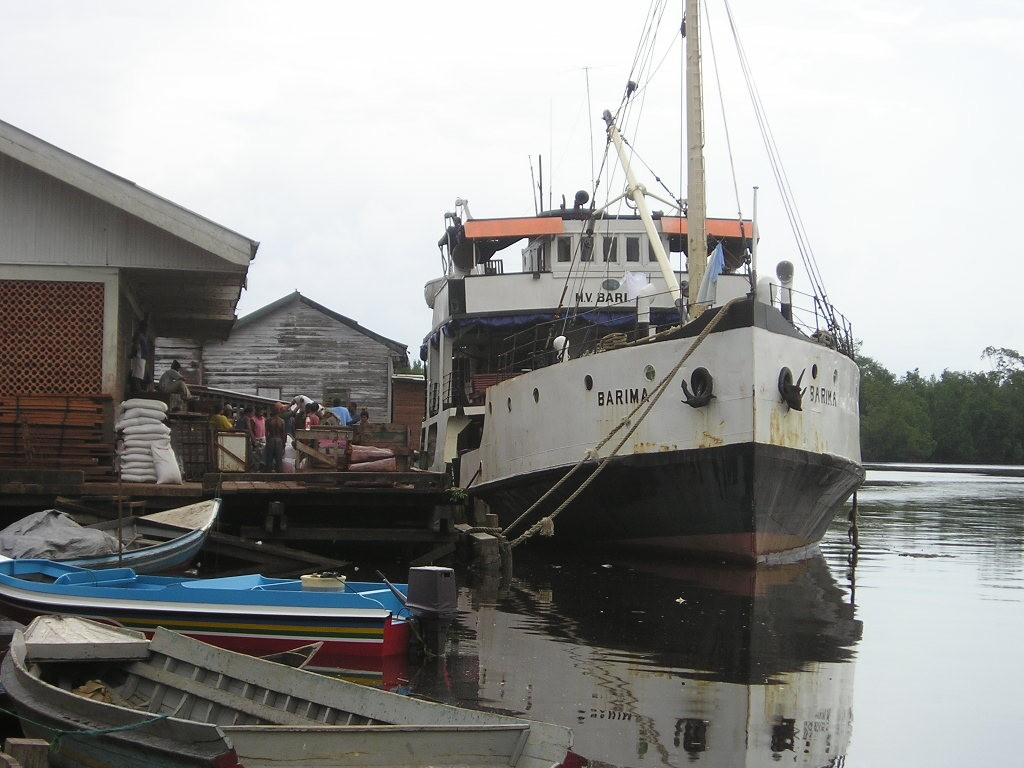
- Barima at Georgetown in 2004

History

Guyana
- Name: Barima
- Operator: Transport and Harbours Department
- Builder: Ferguson Brothers Ltd.
- Yard number: 340
- Launched: 9 May 1939; 87 years ago
- Fate: Capsized and sank 18 July 2026

General characteristics
- Class & type: Ferry
- Tonnage: 284 GT; 198 DWT
- Length: 40.26 m (132 ft 1 in)
- Beam: 8.87 m (29 ft 1 in)
- Depth: 2.87 m (9 ft 5 in)
- Decks: 2
- Speed: 10.5 kn (19.4 km/h; 12.1 mph) max speed, 8.5 kn (15.7 km/h; 9.8 mph) cruising speed
- Capacity: 394
- Crew: 18

MV Barima was a Guyanese passenger ferry that was built in 1939 and operated only in the country. On 18 July 2026, the state-owned vessel capsized and sank off the coast of Guyana. Out of the at least 162 passengers and 17 crew on board, 77 were killed, 76 were rescued and more than 26 were reported missing. Officials described the sinking as one of the country's worst maritime disasters.

== Description ==
Barima was a Guyana-flagged passenger ferry operated by the Transport and Harbours Department. It was built by Scottish shipbuilding company Ferguson Brothers Ltd (now Ferguson Marine) and launched on 9 May 1939; ownership passed to the government of Guyana at independence in 1966. The Barima was 40.26 m (132 ft 1 in) long and 8.87 m (29 ft 1 in) wide, with two decks and a capacity of 394 passengers and 18 crew. It was equipped with 250 life jackets, six inflatable life rafts and two rigid life rafts. The maximum speed of the vessel was 10.5 kn (19.4 km/h; 12.1 mph), while the cruising speed was 8.5 kn (15.7 km/h; 9.8 mph).

The vessel had served the North West District route for more than four decades, transporting both passengers and cargo on weekly trips between the capital Georgetown and the largely Indigenous communities of Mabaruma, Morawhanna and Port Kaituma without major incident. In 2019, her sister ship, MV Lady Northcote, ceased operations, making Barima the only vessel serving that route.

== Sinking ==
On 18 July 2026, at approximately 3:15 p.m. local time, the MV Barima departed from Georgetown en route to a gold-mining outpost in Port Kaituma, carrying 179 passengers and crew. Officials initially reported that 133 people were on the ferry, but increased the number after reviewing the boarding process. The vessel was also carrying several heavy items of cargo loaded by the government. At around 11:00 p.m., the vessel capsized and sank after a large wave — apparently a rogue wave — struck her in the North Atlantic Ocean off the coast of Guyana near the Pomeroon River, approximately 7 miles (6.1 nmi; 11 km) from shore.

Search and rescue operations were launched, but were hampered by darkness and lack of vessels with scanners that could search for survivors, leaving rescuers reliant on sight and sound. Companies in the oil and gas sector subsequently deployed vessels with scanners, and the government activated divers to enter the ferry to search for bodies. Authorities also expanded the search area to 1,040 square kilometers (401 square miles) from 400 square kilometres (154 square miles).

By 28 July, at least 77 bodies had been recovered, with 76 other passengers rescued and 26 reported missing. At least 15 children and 13 crew members were among the deceased, while 15 children and 11 women were rescued. The captain and three other crew members survived. The French Army sent personnel from French Guiana to aid the search-and-rescue operation.

The Public Works Minister, Juan Edghill, confirmed that the state-owned vessel was uninsured, according to a practice long in operation, whereby the government assumed responsibility for losses and any compensation resulting from an incident.

== Wreck ==
The wreck of Barima lies 7 miles (6.1 nmi; 11 km) northeast of the mouth of the Pomeroon River at 07°28.213′N 058°23.443′W. It lies on its side in soft mud at a depth of 13 to 15 metres (43 to 49 feet).

== Investigation ==
The vessel's captain and at least one other crew member were taken into custody after testing positive for marijuana. Prime Minister Mark Phillips launched an investigation into potential institutional failures, promising that anyone found guilty of negligence or misconduct will face legal action. On 28 July, captain Kevin Price and two crew members, Rondell Dwayne Roberts and Delon Granderson, were charged with 77 counts of murder for each victim killed in the sinking.

== Aftermath ==
Guyanese President Irfaan Ali declared three days of national mourning following the sinking, with flags being flown at half-mast. Ferry safety procedures were tightened after the disaster. Tribute to the Barima victims was paid at the 2026 Commonwealth Games opening ceremony in Glasgow, where Guyanese athletes and officials wore black armbands and black attire as they entered the stadium.

On 26 July, President Ali announced a five-member international Commission of Inquiry into the disaster.

At a press briefing on 28 July, it was disclosed that several international proposals had been received by the government of Guyana to salvage the sunken vessel from the seabed off Essequibo. Linked to the possibility of operations to salvage the Barima and recover victims' bodies being unsuccessful, a government proposal mooted that the area be considered a memorial site, with Kaieteur News reporting the views of relatives that "this should be taken to Parliament or properly discussed with all the families." Referring to a questionnaire being circulated to victims' families asking whether they wanted the MV Barima to be salvaged or to remain on the sea floor, Prime Minister Phillips said on 28 July that the government was willing to yield to the wishes of the survivors.

== See also ==
- Christena disaster – 1970 ferry boat wreck between St. Kitts & Nevis
