= Pinney's Beach =

Beach in Saint Kitts and Nevis

Coordinates: 17°09′57″N 62°37′43″W

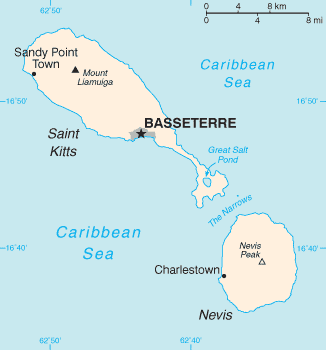
Map of St. Kitts and Nevis. Nevis is the more southerly of the two islands. Pinney's Beach extends for 3 miles north of Charlestown.

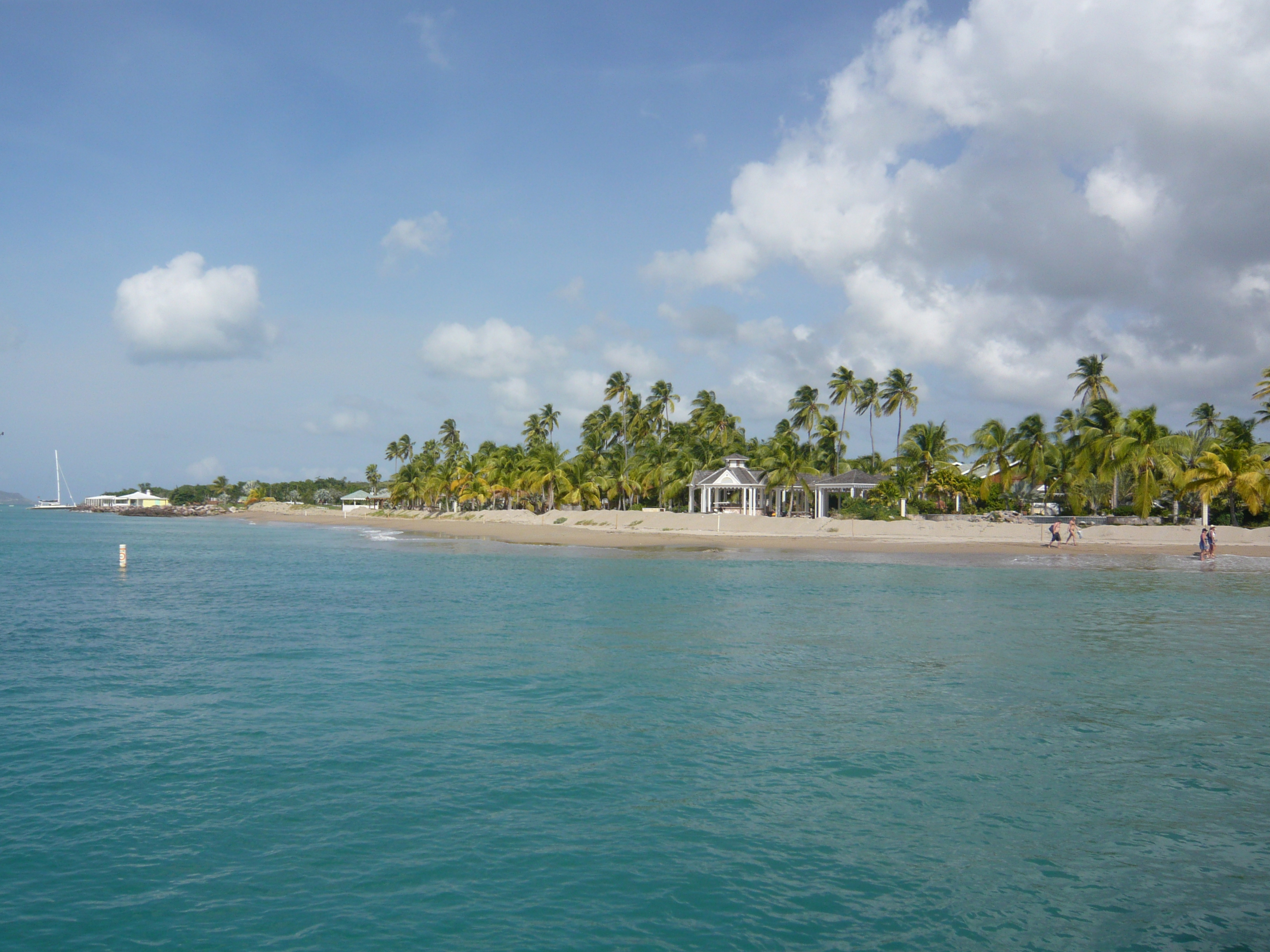
Pinney's Beach in 2010

Pinney's Beach, also spelled Pinneys Beach, is a very long sandy beach on the western Caribbean coast of the island of Nevis, in Saint Kitts and Nevis, Leeward Islands in the West Indies. The southern end of Pinneys Beach starts just outside the capital, Charlestown. The beach extends north three miles from there, ending at the northern point of Cades Bay, which is currently where the Sea Bridge ferry dock is located. That is near the southern entrance to The Narrows, the strait separating Nevis from the neighboring island of Saint Kitts.

Pinneys Beach takes its name from Pinneys Estate. This was a large piece of land, a plantation which in the 19th century was owned by the Pinney family, who lived on Nevis for several generations.
