= National Museum of Saint Kitts =

Museum in Basseterre, Saint George Basseterre, Saint Kitts and Nevis

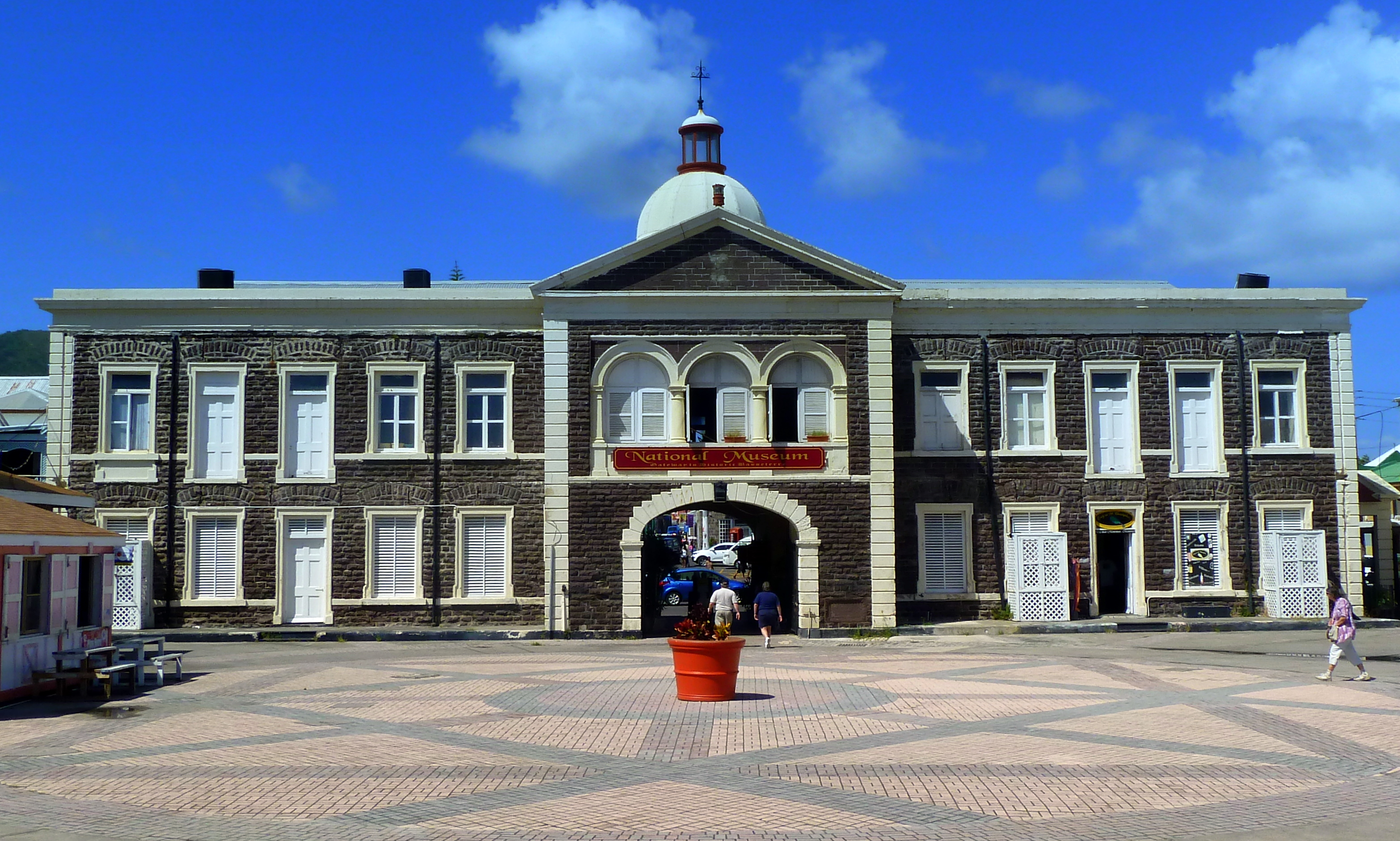
- Former name: Treasury Building
- Established: 2002
- Location: Basseterre, Saint George Basseterre, Saint Kitts and Nevis
- Coordinates: 17°17′40.5″N 62°43′25.4″W
- Type: museum

The National Museum of Saint Kitts is a museum in Basseterre, Saint George Basseterre Parish, Saint Kitts and Nevis. It is run by the St. Christopher National Trust.

== History ==
The current museum building was originally constructed as Treasury Building in 1894. It was once used as the entry port from the nearby pier. In 1996, the treasury moved to a new building. In 2002, the museum was finally opened.

== Geology ==
The museum building once stood at the waterfront south of Saint Kitts Island facing the Basseterre Bay. Now the area south of the building has been reclaimed.

== Architecture ==
The museum spans over an area of 900 m^{2}.

== Exhibitions ==
The museum showcases the culture and heritage of Saint Kitts and Nevis.

== See also ==
- List of museums in Saint Kitts and Nevis
