= Diocese of Saint John's–Basseterre =

Latin Catholic ecclesiastical jurisdiction in the Caribbean

Coordinates: 17°06′58″N 61°50′16″W

Diocese of Saint John's–Basseterre Dioecesis Sancti Ioannis–Imatelluranus
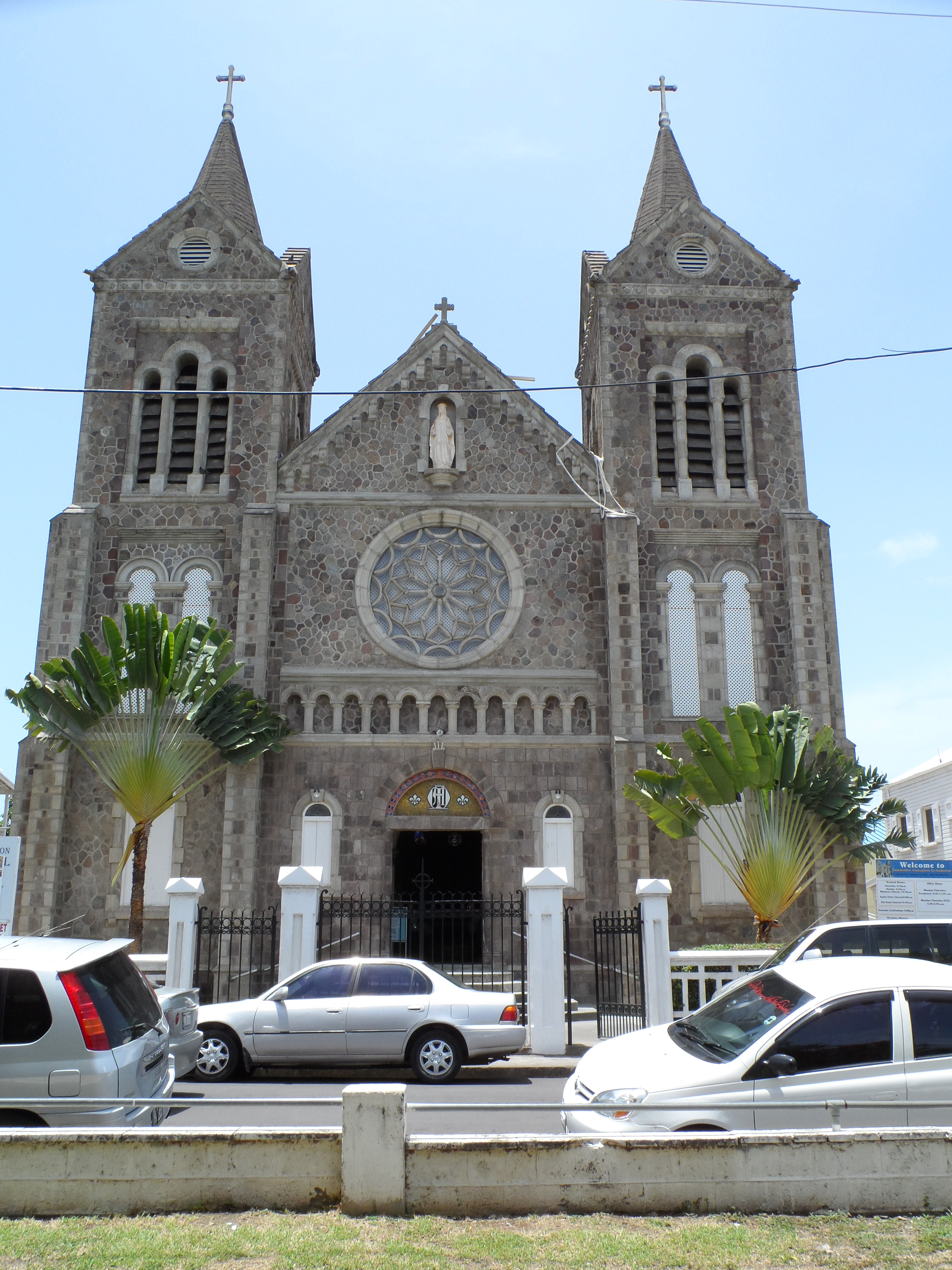
- Basseterre Cathedral

Location
- Country: Antigua and Barbuda Saint Kitts and Nevis Montserrat, UK Anguilla, UK British Virgin Islands, UK
- Ecclesiastical province: Province of Castries

Statistics
- Area: 1,050 km^{2} (410 sq mi)
- Population: Total; Catholics: (as of 2010); 169,787; 14,878 (8.8%)
- Parishes: 10

Information
- Denomination: Catholic
- Sui iuris church: Latin Church
- Rite: Roman Rite
- Established: 16 January 1971 (55 years ago)
- Cathedral: Holy Family Cathedral
- Co-cathedral: Co-Cathedral of the Immaculate Conception

Current leadership
- Pope: Leo XIV
- Bishop: Robert Anthony Llanos
- Metropolitan Archbishop: Robert Rivas O.P.
- Bishops emeritus: Kenneth Richards Donald James Reece Joseph O Bowers

Map
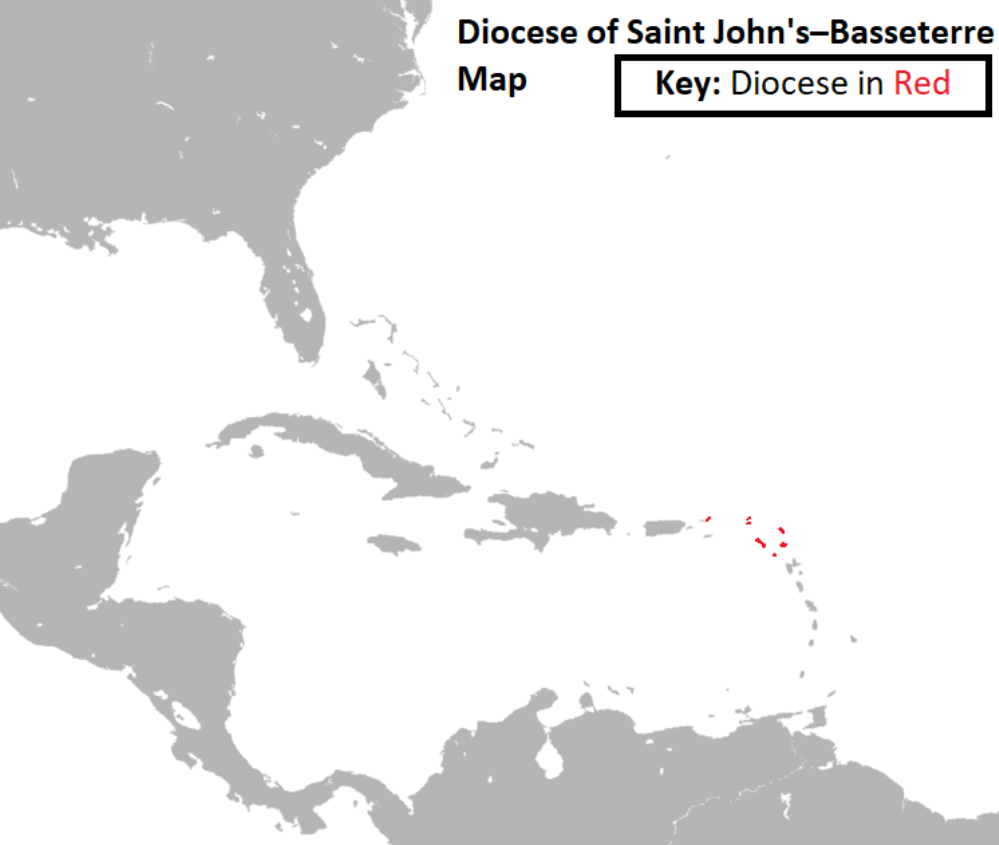

The Diocese of Saint John's–Basseterre (Latin: Dioecesis Sancti Ioannis–Imatellurana) is a diocese of the Latin Church of the Catholic Church, covering five English-speaking jurisdictions in the Caribbean. The bishopric is a suffragan of the Metropolitan Archdiocese of Castries, and a member of the Antilles Episcopal Conference, but remains dependent on the missionary Dicastery for Evangelization.

== Cathedrals ==
It has two cathedrals, the Holy Family Cathedral in St John's, Antigua, and a co-cathedral, the Cathedral of the Immaculate Conception in Basseterre, St Kitts. Both churches are the seats of the bishop, who is currently the Most Rev. Robert Llanos, formerly Auxiliary Bishop of Port of Spain (Trinidad and Tobago).

The Holy Family Cathedral was completed and opened in 1987, during the tenure of Bishop Donald James Reece (1981–2007), who dedicated it. It was designed in the Modernist style with an octagon with a bell tower at the centre. On the tower there is a large cross, the largest external church cross in the country. There are also electronic synthesised bells which chime on the hour, before Mass and at the end of funerals.

The cathedral is of post-Vatican II Latin Rite, but on the feasts of the Epiphany and of the Assumption, Sunday Mass is celebrated according to the Byzantine Rite.

== Extent and statistics ==
The diocese encompasses the islands of five Anglophone countries in the Lesser Antilles :

- Antigua and Barbuda, which has the see Holy Family Cathedral in St John's, Antigua
- Saint Kitts and Nevis, which has a co-cathedral of the Immaculate Conception in Basseterre, St Kitts
- Anguilla
- Montserrat
- the British Virgin Islands.

As per 2014, it pastorally served 16,743 Catholics (9.0% of 186,880 total) on 1,059 km² in 13 parishes and 20 missions with 12 priests (3 diocesan, 9 religious), 3 deacons and 21 lay religious (9 brothers, 12 sisters).

== History ==
The diocese was erected on 16 January 1971 as Diocese of Saint John's, on territory split off from the Diocese of Roseau (Dominica).

On 21 June 1981, it was renamed as Diocese of Saint John's–Basseterre.

== Episcopal ordinaries ==
(all Roman Rite)

Suffragan Bishop of Saint John's

- Joseph Oliver Bowers, S.V.D. (16 January 1971 – 21 June 1981)

Suffragan Bishops of Saint John's–Basseterre

- Joseph Oliver Bowers, S.V.D. (21 June 1971 – 17 July 1981, retired)
- Donald James Reece (17 July 1981 – 12 October 2007, appointed as Coadjutor Archbishop of Kingston in Jamaica)
  sede vacante, Apostolic Administrator, Gabriel Malzaire (12 October 2007 – 19 November 2011)
- Kenneth David Oswin Richards (19 November 2011 – 29 April 2016, appointed as Coadjutor Archbishop of Kingston in Jamaica)
  sede vacante, Apostolic Administrator, Robert Anthony Llanos (20 June 2016 – 18 December 2018)
- Robert Anthony Llanos (since 18 December 2018)

== See also ==
- List of Catholic dioceses (structured view)
- St. Theresa Church, Charlestown
- St. William's Church, Road Town

== Sources and external links ==
- GCatholic, with Google map and satellite photo
- Radio for the Diocese
- "Saint John's-Basseterre". Catholic-Hierarchy.
