= St. William's Church =

St. William's Church may refer to:

- St. William's Church, Road Town, British Virgin Islands
- St William's Church, Strasbourg, France
- St. William's Catholic Church (Long Lake, New York)
