= St. William's Church, Road Town =

Coordinates: 18°25′17″N 64°37′08″W

St. William's Church
- St. William's Church
- Location: Road Town; Tortola
- Country: British Virgin Islands
- Denomination: Roman Catholic Church

Administration
- Diocese: Roman Catholic Diocese of Saint John's-Basseterre
- Parish: St. Williams

St. William's Church is a Catholic church in Road Town, the capital of the British Virgin Islands.

Although the community was founded in 1957 with a small chapel it was completed in 1993 and the first church much larger current building dates from 1999 and included the construction of a parish hall and administrative offices. It follows the Roman or Latin rite and is part of the Diocese of Saint John's - Basseterre. Most Masses are held in English with one in Spanish on Saturdays.

== See also ==
- Holy Family Cathedral (St. John's)
