= List of schools in Saint Kitts and Nevis =

== Preschools ==
=== St. Kitts ===
- Diligent Hands Child Care Center
- Kebabies Child Development Centre
- Little Learners Academy
- Montessori Academy
- Vanta E. Walters Daycare Center
- Leonie James Preschool
- Cradles Preschool
- Tabernacle Daycare Centre

== Primary schools ==
=== St. Kitts ===
Christ Church Nichola Town

- Estridge Primary School
- Joshua Obadiah Williams Primary School (Molineux Primary School)

Saint Anne Sandy Point

- Sandy Point Primary School

Saint George Basseterre

- Beach Allen Primary School
- Cotton Thomas Comprehensive School
- Dr. William Connor Primary School
- George Moody Stuart School (Private)
- Haliday-Smith Primary School (formerly Irish Town Primary School)
- Epworth/Maurice Hillier Memorial Junior School (Private)-Methodist
- St. Kitts International Academy (SKI Academy - Private School) Grades 1 - high school. (formerly - Montessori Academy (Private))
- (ICCS)Immaculate Conception Catholic School(Private)-Catholic formerly Saint Theresa's Convent School (Private) & Saint Joseph's Primary School (Private)
- St. Kitts Seventh-Day Adventist Primary School (Private)
- Tucker Clarke Primary School
- St. Christopher's Preparatory School (Private)

Saint John Capesterre

- Dieppe Bay Primary School
- Edgar T Morris Primary School (Tabernacle)
- Saddlers Primary School

Saint Mary Cayon

- Cayon Primary School
- Violet Petty Primary School (Lodge Project)

Saint Paul Capisterre

- Newton Ground Primary School
- St. Pauls Primary School

Saint Peter Basseterre

- Dean Glasford Primary School

Saint Thomas Middle Island

- Tyrell Williams Primary School

Trinity Palmetto Point

- Ross Preparatory School (Private)
- Bronte Welsh Primary School

=== Nevis ===
- Nevis Academy (formerly Bellevue International Primary School)
- Charlestown Primary School
- Ivor Walters Primary School (formerly Prospect Primary School) - De Metropolis
- Joycelyn Liburd Primary School (formerly Gingerland Primary School)
- Maude Crosse Preparatory School (formerly Charlestown Preparatory School)(Private)
- St. James Primary School
- Elizabeth Pemberton Primary School (formerly St. Johns Primary School)
- St. Thomas'/Lowlands Primary School
- Violet O Jeffers-Nicholls Primary School (Combermere Primary School)
- Montessori Academy Nevis(Private)
- Cecele Browne Integrated School (Special Education Unit)

== Secondary schools ==
=== St. Kitts ===
1st-5th form (Similar to British System of education)

- Cayon High School
- Washington Archibald High School
- Verchilds High School
- Charles E. Mills Secondary School(CEMSS) formerly Sandy Point High School
- Basseterre High School
- Dr. Denzil L. Douglas Secondary School ( formerly Saddlers Secondary School)
- (ICCS) Immaculate Conception Catholic School (Private) formerly St. Theresa's Convent High School (Private)-Catholic
- (Ski Academy) St. Kitts International Academy (Private)
- St. Christopher Preparatory School (Private)

=== Nevis ===
- Charlestown Secondary School
- Gingerland Secondary School
- (NISS) Nevis International Secondary School (Private)

== Higher education ==
- International University of the Health Sciences
- Ross University School of Veterinary Medicine
- Robert Ross International University of Nursing
- University of Medicine and Health Sciences
- Windsor University School of Medicine
- University of the West Indies
- Medical University of the Americas
