= Basseterre Co-Cathedral of Immaculate Conception =

Cathedral in Basseterre, St. Kitts and Nevis

Coordinates: 17°17′46.9″N 62°43′17.5″W

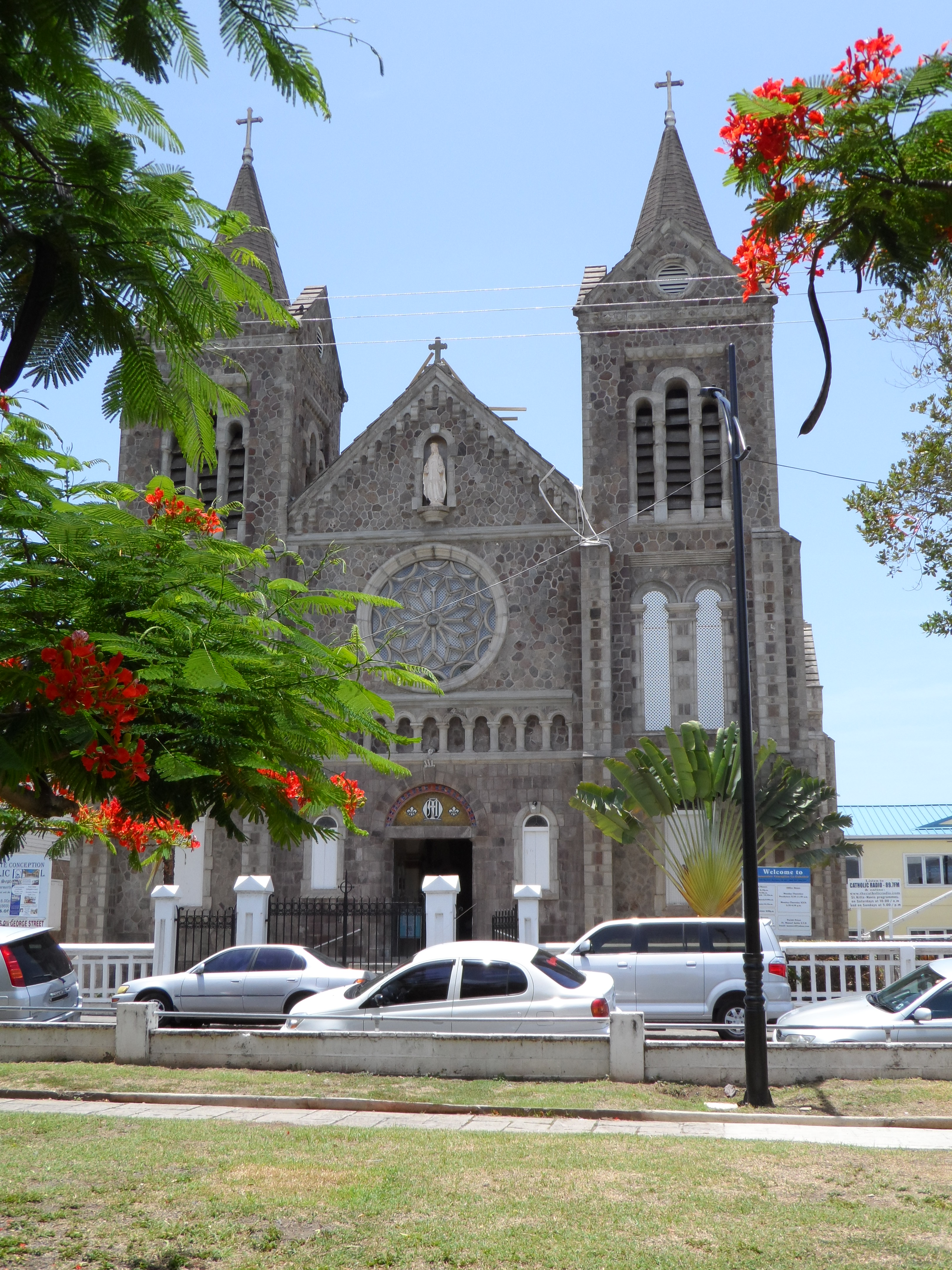
Basseterre Co-Cathedral of Immaculate Conception

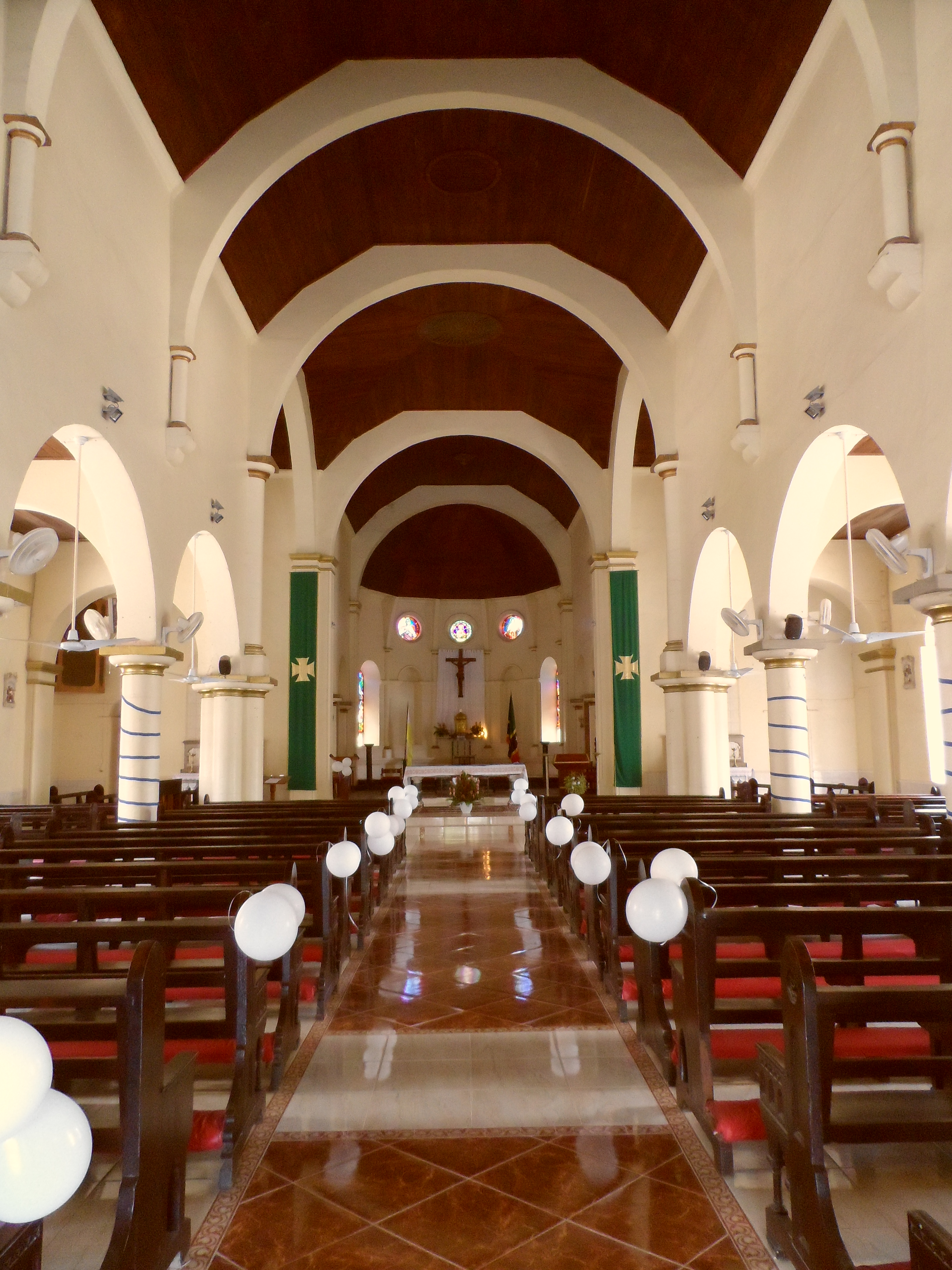
The interior of the cathedral

The Basseterre Co-Cathedral of Immaculate Conception is a cathedral in the city of Basseterre, St. Kitts and Nevis.

== History ==
In the early stages of the French occupation of Basseterre, a Roman Catholic church was erected in the town by the Jesuits and dedicated to Our Lady. Notre Dame was burnt to the ground in 1706 during the Anglo-French War by English soldiers who were billeted there. The Church was re-built by 1710 and renamed St. George's. From the 1720s, it became a place of worship for the Anglicans.

After the take-over of the island by the English in 1713, Roman Catholics were forbidden by law to worship in public. They also suffered certain civil and military disabilities. For example, Roman Catholics were required to take and subscribe certain oaths and declarations, such as the declaration against Transubstantiation, before they would qualify for civil or military office or for sitting and voting in the island's legislature. An Act passed in 1829 finally to remove all disabilities. As a consequence, there was a revival of Roman Catholicism.

The steady influx of Portuguese migrants from the island of Madeira from 1835 onwards strengthened the growth of the Roman Catholic community.

A church was built in or about 1856; it was called the Church of the Immaculate Conception. In 1927, it was demolished and replaced by a modern edifice on the same site on East Square Street. Father Claeys who was an architect of repute designed the church. It was dedicated on 6 December 1928.

The Formation House was the residence for the Catholic nuns and the Manse was for the priests.
