= Charlestown, Nevis =

Charlestown
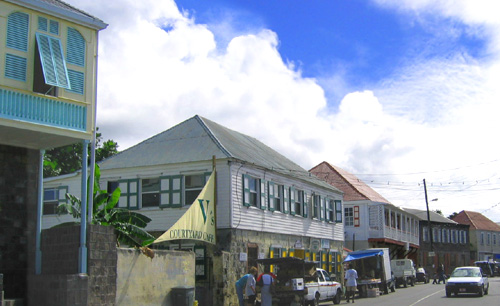
- The main street of Charlestown

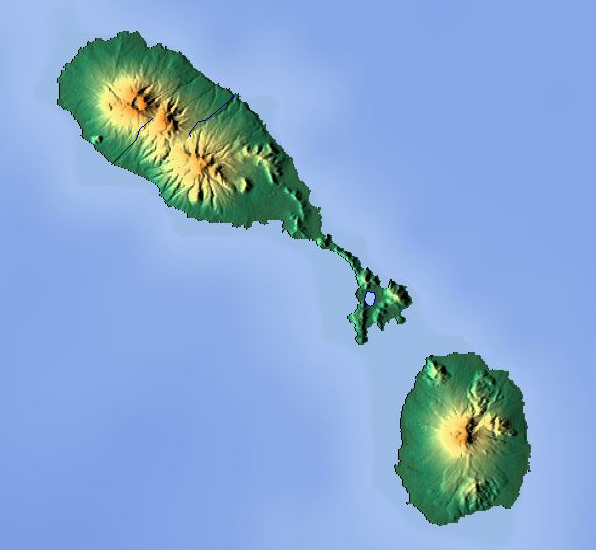
- Location of Charlestown in Saint Kitts and Nevis Charlestown (the Caribbean)
- Coordinates: 17°08′35″N 62°37′37″W
- Country: Saint Kitts and Nevis
- Island: Nevis
- Parish: Saint Paul Charlestown

Population (2006)
  - Total: 1,500
- Time zone: UTC-04:00 (AST)

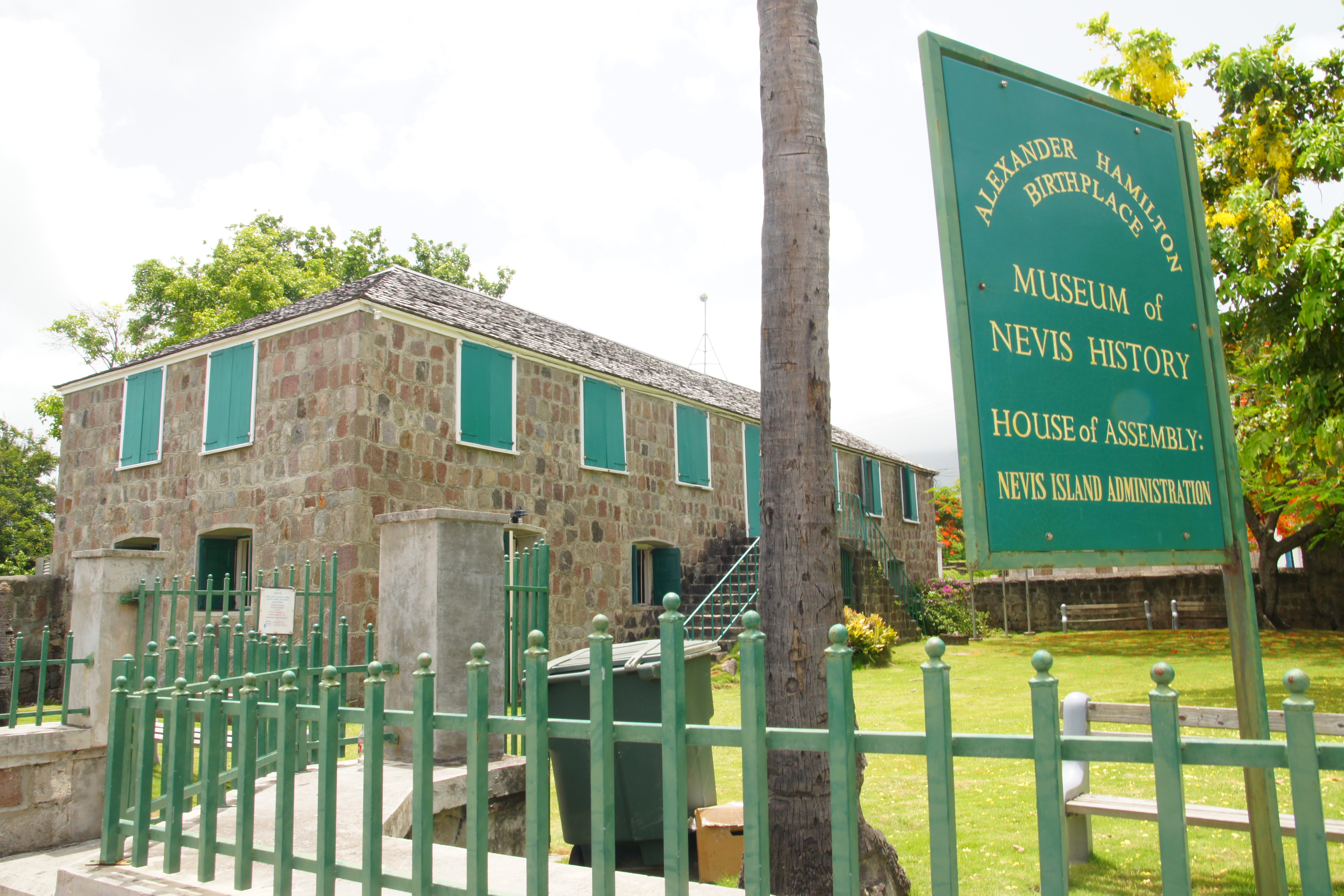
The Museum of Nevis History in Charlestown is housed in a refurbished structure that was the birthplace of Alexander Hamilton

Charlestown is the capital of the island of Nevis in the Federation of Saint Kitts and Nevis in the Leeward Islands of the West Indies. Charlestown is situated on the leeward side of the island of Nevis near the southern end of Pinney's Beach.

Charlestown was originally called Bath Bay in reference to Bath Stream, a stream noted for its curative waters. It became the chief town after Jamestown, Nevis's first settlement, was inundated by a tidal wave in 1680. In the late 18th century, Charlestown was both a naval base and a resort known for mineral waters. The town was almost destroyed by fire in 1873.

The main industry in Charlestown is sugar milling. Notable buildings in Charlestown include Hamilton House, where Alexander Hamilton, a Founding Father of the United States and framer of the U.S. Constitution, was born, and the nearby ruins of Montpelier Estate, where the British naval hero Horatio Nelson was married.

Historically, in colonial times, the town of Charlestown was protected by Fort Charles to the south and Fort Black Rocks to the north. Many of the oldest two-story stone buildings were severely damaged over time by earthquakes, which tended to cause the upper story to collapse into the lower story. This unfortunate design flaw led to the common practice of building a wooden upper floor above a stone ground floor.

Charlestown was the birthplace and childhood home of Alexander Hamilton. The restored stone building which was his place of birth now houses the Museum of Nevis History on the ground floor, and the Nevis Island Administration Assembly Room on the upper floor. There are two other museums in Charlestown: the Nelson Museum, and the Nevis Sport Museum, as well as the Philatelic Bureau.

There are many other important buildings in the town, some historical and some recent, such as the Post Office, the old Treasury Building which is now the Nevis Tourism Authority, the Court House and Public Library, the new Police Station and the Alexandra Hospital. At the northern end of town is the Bath Hotel and Spring House, which was a famous tourist hotel and spa during the 18th century. The main building of the Bath Hotel was for a while occupied by government offices.

Charlestown has a population of 1,500. It is the main administrative and commercial center for the island of Nevis and is also the most concentrated residential area on the island. It is the hub for much of the transportation in Nevis. There is a modern port area with a dock where the ferries from St. Kitts load and unload passengers. However, Charlestown lacks a commercial airport.

Memorial Square commemorates all the Nevisian soldiers who died during World Wars I and II. Nearby is the Cotton Ginnery Mall which supplies some of Nevis' residents' recreational shopping needs.

The education system on Nevis is similar to the British system. There are five pre-schools and seven primary schools (grades K–6). Primary schools are government-provided. In addition, there are three private primary schools. After primary school, children attend one of three secondary schools. Please also see the article: List of schools in Saint Kitts and Nevis.

== See also ==
- St. Theresa Church
