= Saint Paul Charlestown Parish =

Coordinates: 17°08′09″N 62°36′37″W

Saint Paul Charlestown
- Parish
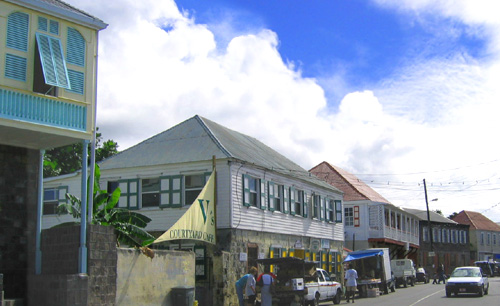
- The main street of Charlestown

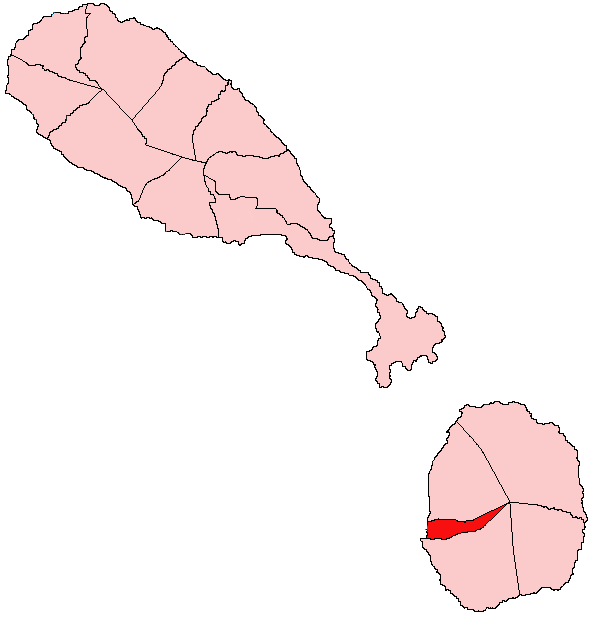
- Country: Saint Kitts and Nevis
- Capital: Charlestown

Area
  - Total: 4 km^{2} (1.5 sq mi)

Population (2011)
  - Total: 1,847
  - Density: 462/km^{2} (1,200/sq mi)

Saint Paul Charlestown is one of 14 administrative parishes that make up Saint Kitts and Nevis. It is located on the island of Nevis, and the parish capital is Charlestown, which is also capital of the entire island.

Saint Paul Charlestown is the smallest parish in the federation, being only 4 square kilometers in area, and consisting of barely more than the town of Charlestown, and its portion of Nevis Peak. Despite being the smallest, it is the most important parish on Nevis, and the second most important in the entire country. Home to the capital, it houses all of Nevis' government buildings, as well as many of the island's historic sites.

== Land ==
Nevis being a somewhat round island, it is divided into five parishes somewhat like a sliced pie, with each parish having a portion of coastline, and a small part of Nevis Peak in the centre. Saint Paul Charlestown has a much shorter length of coast than any other parish: only about 1/2 mile. From this developed coastline, which consists almost entirely of the Charlestown port, the parish's boundaries move inland, over gently sloping terrain, until the base of Nevis Peak is reached. From there, the land rises sharply to the peak's summit, at 3,232 feet, just 3 miles inland. The higher parts of the mountain slopes are draped in tropical forests, and the town of Charlestown dominates the coastal plain.

== Settlements ==
The main settlement in Saint Paul Charlestown is the town of Charlestown. The only other settlement within the parish boundaries is a part of the village of Craddocks.

== Economy ==
Saint Paul Charlestown is Nevis' economic headquarters. Most of the island's businesses are located there, and a significant portion of the island's workforce are employed in the town of Charlestown. The parish, and specifically Charlestown, is a major international financial services centre, and financial service is the main business in the parish.

== Port ==
The Charlestown Port is the island's busiest port, where numerous ferries dock that service Basseterre and Montserrat. It is also used for yacht moorings.
