= Visa requirements for Saint Kitts and Nevis citizens =

Administrative entry restrictions

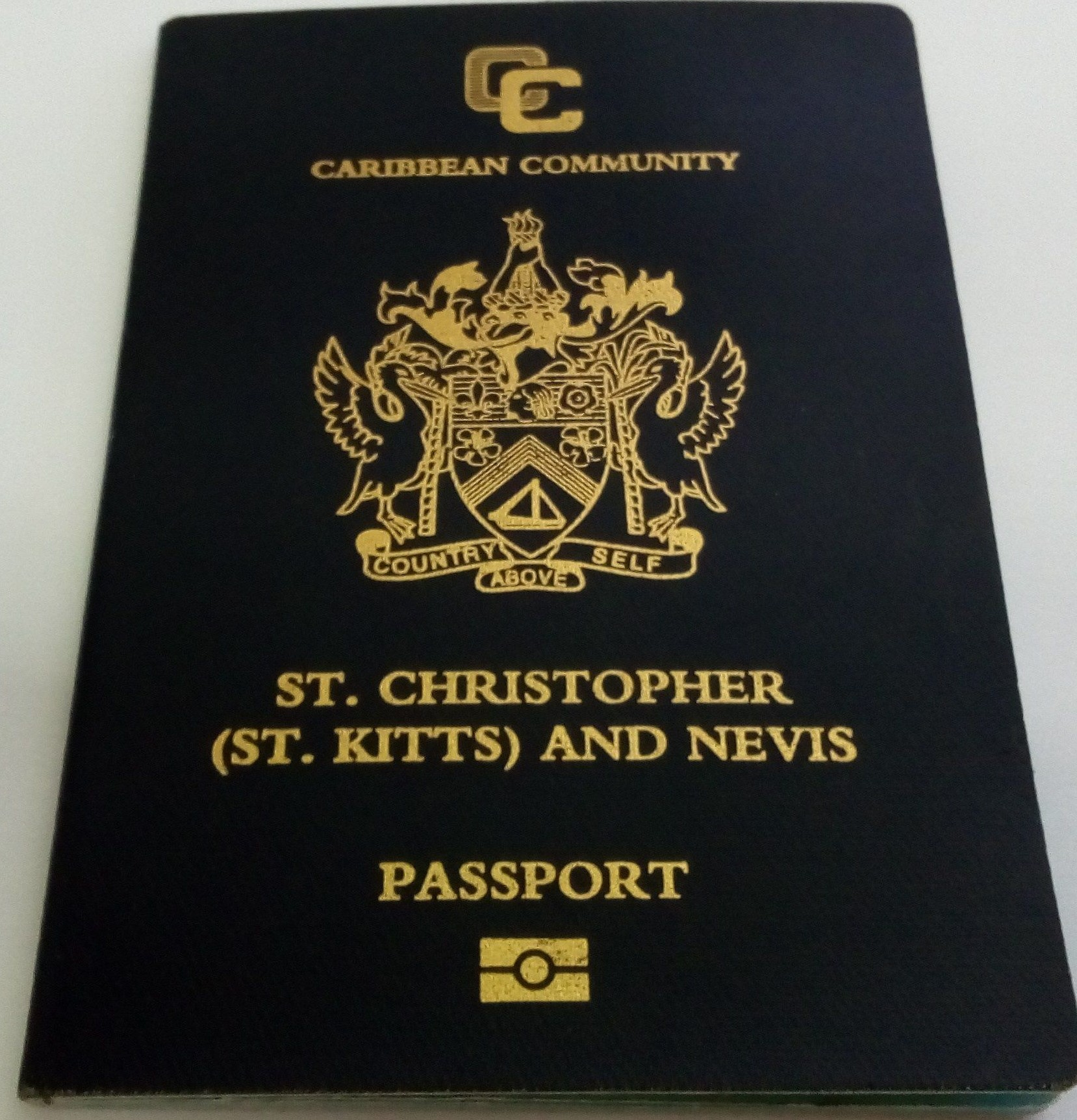
St Kitts & Nevis Passport

As of 2026, citizens of Saint Kitts and Nevis had visa-free or visa on arrival access (including eTAs) to 157 countries and territories, ranking the Saint Kitts and Nevis passport 19th, in terms of travel freedom according to the Henley Passport Index and it is ranked 21st by the Global Passport Power Rank.

== Visa requirements map ==
Visa requirements for Saint Kitts and Nevis citizens Saint Kitts and Nevis Freedom of movement Visa-free Visa available both on arrival or online Visa on arrival eVisa Visa required

== Visa requirements ==
Country	Visa requirement	Allowed stay	Notes (excluding departure fees)	Reciprocity
Afghanistan	Visa required		Visa isn't required if they born in Afghanistan or their parent is a national of Afghanistan or was born in Afghanistan.	✓
Albania	Visa not required	90 days		✓
Algeria	Visa required		Tourists to cities in the south of Algeria (Timimoun, Ghardaia, Ilizi, Djanet or Tamanraset) can obtain a visa upon arrival for a maximum of 30 days, but must have a return/onward ticket and a hotel reservation confirmation	✓
Andorra	Visa not required			X
Angola	Visa not required	30 days		✓
Antigua and Barbuda	Freedom of movement	Freedom of movement for OECS states; ID card valid		✓
Argentina	Visa not required	90 days		✓
Armenia	eVisa	120 days	May apply for a visa on arrival only if holding a valid visa or valid permanent resident permit (resident card) issued by Australia, Belarus, Canada, Gulf Cooperation Council countries, Japan, New Zealand, Russia, Singapore, South Korea, European Union / Schengen Area member states, United Kingdom or United States.	X
Australia and territories	Visa required		May apply online (Online Visitor e600 visa).	X
Austria	Visa not required	90 days	90 days during a 180 days period following the date of first entry in the Schengen Area;	✓
Azerbaijan	Visa required		If holding a residence visa issued by the United Arab Emirates may obtain a 30-day tourist visa on arrival in Azerbaijan. must present their valid visa or residence permit along with their passport.	✓
Bahamas	Visa not required	3 months	Extension of stay is possible	✓
Bahrain	eVisa / Visa on arrival			✓
Bangladesh	Visa not required	90 days		✓
Barbados	Visa not required	6 months	Holders of Caricom Certificate of Skills can stay indefinitely.	✓
Belarus	Visa not required	30 days		✓
Belgium	Visa not required	3 months	90 days during 180 days period following the date of first entry in the Schengen Area;	✓
Belize	Visa not required		Holders of Caricom Certificate of Skills can stay indefinitely.	✓
Benin	eVisa	30 days / 8 days	Must have an international vaccination certificate.	X
Bhutan	eVisa	90 days	Must pay 100 USD per person per day for sustainable development fee	x
Bolivia	Visa on arrival	90 days		✓
Bosnia and Herzegovina	Visa not required	90 days	90 days within any 180 days period	X
Botswana	Visa not required	90 days	90 days within any year period	✓
Brazil	Visa not required	90 days		✓
Brunei	Visa required			X
Bulgaria	Visa not required	90 days	90 days during a 180 days period following the date of the first entry in the Schengen Area;	✓
Burkina Faso	eVisa	1 month		x
Burundi	eVisa / Visa on arrival	1 month		x
Cambodia	eVisa / Visa on arrival	30 days		X
Cameroon	eVisa			x
Canada	Visa required		Citizens of Saint Kitts and Nevis who have held a Canadian visa within the past 10 years or who currently hold a valid non-immigrant U.S. visa can apply for an eTA when arriving by air. They may not enter Canada by land or sea unless holding a valid visa.	X
Cape Verde	Visa on arrival		Not available at all entry points.	X
Central African Republic	Visa required			✓
Chad	eVisa			✓
Chile	Visa not required	90 days		✓
China	Visa required		May obtain a visa upon arrival at Shenzhen (SZX) for a maximum of 5 days if traveling as tourists and must not leave Shenzhen during the stay.	X
Colombia	Visa not required	90 days	90 days – extendable up to 180-days stay within a one year period	✓
Comoros	Visa on arrival	45 days		X
Republic of the Congo	Visa required			✓
Democratic Republic of the Congo	eVisa			✓
Costa Rica	Visa not required	30 days		✓
Côte d'Ivoire	eVisa		Must be picked up at Port Bouet Airport in Abidjan	x
Croatia	Visa not required	90 days	90 days during 180 days period following the date of the first entry in the Schengen Area;	✓
Cuba	Visa not required	30 days		✓
Cyprus	Visa not required	90 days	90 days during 180 days period	✓
Czech Republic	Visa not required	90 days	90 days during 180 days period following the date of first entry in the Schengen Area;	✓
Denmark and territories	Visa not required	90 days	90 days during 180 days period following the date of first entry in the Schengen Area;	✓
Djibouti	eVisa	31 days		X
Dominica	Freedom of movement	Freedom of movement for OECS states; ID card valid		✓
Dominican Republic	Visa not required	30 days	Can be extended up to 120 days with fee	X
Ecuador	Visa not required	90 days		✓
Egypt	Visa required	30 days		✓
El Salvador	Visa not required	180 days		✓
Equatorial Guinea	eVisa		Must arrive via Malabo International Airport, processing fee 75 USD	✓
Eritrea	Visa required			✓
Estonia	Visa not required	90 days	90 days during 180 days period following the date of first entry in the Schengen Area;	✓
Eswatini	Visa required			✓
Ethiopia	eVisa	up to 90 days	eVisa holders must arrive via Addis Ababa Bole International Airport	x
Fiji	Visa not required	4 months		✓
Finland	Visa not required	90 days	90 days during 180 days period following the date of first entry in the Schengen Area;	✓
France	Visa not required	90 days	90 days during 180 days period following the date of first entry in the Schengen Area;	✓
Gabon	eVisa	90 days		x
Gambia	Visa not required	90 days		✓
Georgia	Visa not required	90 days	90 days within any 180 days period	X
Germany	Visa not required	90 days	90 days during 180 days period following the date of first entry in the Schengen Area;	✓
Ghana	Visa not required	90 days		X
Greece	Visa not required	90 days	90 days during 180 days period following the date of first entry in the Schengen Area;	✓
Grenada	Freedom of movement	Freedom of movement for OECS states; ID card valid		✓
Guatemala	Visa not required	90 days		✓
Guinea	eVisa			✓
Guinea-Bissau	Visa on arrival	90 days		X
Guyana	Visa not required	6 months	Holders of Caricom Certificate of Skills can stay indefinitely.	✓
Haiti	Visa not required	3 months		X
Honduras	Visa not required	90 days		✓
Hungary	Visa not required	90 days	90 days during 180 days period following the date of first entry in the Schengen Area;	✓
Iceland	Visa not required	90 days	90 days during 180 days period following the date of first entry in the Schengen Area;	✓
India	e-Visa	30 days	e-Visa holders must arrive via 32 designated airports (Note: Ahmedabad; Amritsar; Bagdogra; Bengaluru; Bhubaneswar; Chandigarh; Chennai; Coimbatore; Delhi; Gaya; Goa-Dabolim; Goa-Manohar; Guwahati; Hyderabad; Indore; Jaipur; Kannur; Kochi; Kolkata; Kozhikode; Lucknow; Madurai; Mangaluru; Mumbai; Nagpur; Port Blair; Pune; Surat; Thiruvananthapuram; Tiruchirappalli; Varanasi; Visakhapatnam) or 5 designated seaports. (Note: Chennai; Cochin; Mormugao (Goa); Mumbai; Mangalore); An Indian e-Tourist Visa may only be obtained twice within 1 calendar year.; Foreigners of Pakistani origin or who hold a Pakistani Passport are not eligible for an e-Visa. Foreigners who are not Pakistani nationals, but whose parents or grandparents (either paternal or maternal) were born in, or were permanent residents in Pakistan, are also not eligible for an e-Visa.	X
Indonesia	eVisa			X
Iran	eVisa/Visa on arrival	30 days	Conditions apply.	X
Iraq	eVisa			✓
Ireland	Visa required			X
Israel	Electronic Travel Authorization	3 months		✓
Italy	Visa not required	3 months	90 days during 180 days period following the date of first entry in the Schengen Area;	✓
Jamaica	Visa not required	6 months	Holders of Caricom Certificate of Skills can stay indefinitely.	✓
Japan	Visa required		Holders of a residence permit in Australia, Brazil, Cambodia, Canada, India, Saudi Arabia, Singapore, South Africa, Taiwan, United Arab Emirates, United Kingdom, United States. can apply for a single entry e-visa individually. The duration of stay for these jurisdictions is up to 90 days (unless otherwise noted). e-Visa holder must arrive in Japan by air	X
Jordan	eVisa /Visa on arrival		Conditions apply.; Not available at all entry points.	X
Kazakhstan	Visa not required	90 days		✓
Kenya	Visa not required	3 months		✓
Kiribati	Visa not required	30 days		✓
North Korea	Visa required			✓
South Korea	Electronic Travel Authorisation	90 days	Korean electronic travel authorization for 2 years.	✓
Kuwait	Visa required		e-Visa can be obtained for holders of a Residence Permit issued by a GCC member state	X
Kyrgyzstan	eVisa		Electronic visa holders must arrive via Manas International Airport or Osh Airport or through land crossings with China (at Irkeshtam and Torugart), Kazakhstan (at Ak-jol, Ak-Tilek, Chaldybar, Chon-Kapka), Tajikistan (at Bor-Dobo, Kulundu, Kyzyl-Bel) and Uzbekistan (at Dostuk).	✓
Laos	eVisa / Visa on arrival	30 days	18 (Note: Savannakhet Airport; Lanetoui - Mengkang (China); Meuangmom - Wan Pong (Myanmar); Banvang - Ban Khok Phai (Thailand); Namngeun - Huay Kon (Thailand); Paksan - Bueng Kan (Thailand); Paktaphan - Pak Saeng (Thailand); Pangmon - Ban Huak (Thailand); Phoudou (Thailand); Dak ta ock - Nam Giang (Vietnam); La Lai (Vietnam); Namkan (Vietnam); Namphao - Cau Treo (Vietnam); Namsoy - Na Meo (Vietnam); Naphao - Cha Lo (Vietnam); Pahang - Long Sap (Vietnam); Panghok - Tây Trang (Vietnam); Phoukeua - Bo Y (Vietnam)) of the 33 border crossings are only open to regular visa holders.; e-Visa may be used to enter Laos through the Luang Prabang, Pakse and Vientiane international airports, 3 Thai-Lao Friendship Bridges (Note: Vientiane (Friendship Bridge 1); Savannakhet (Friendship Bridge 2); Bokeo (Friendship Bridge 4)), in Boten (road and railroad), and in Vientiane (at Khamsavath railway station).; Visa on arrival is available at the Luang Prabang, Pakse and Vientiane international airports, 4 Thai-Lao Friendship Bridges (Note: Vientiane (Friendship Bridge 1); Savannakhet (Friendship Bridge 2); Khammouane (Friendship Bridge 3); Bokeo (Friendship Bridge 4)) and 7 border crossings. (Note: Nongnokkheane - Trapeang Kriel (Cambodia); Boten - Bo han (China); Golden Triangle/Samliemkham (Thailand); Khamsavath railway station (Thailand); Namheuang - Ban Na Kraseng (Thailand); Vang tao - Chongmek (Thailand); Dansavan - Lao Bảo (Vietnam))	X
Latvia	Visa not required	3 months	90 days during 180 days period following the date of first entry in the Schengen Area; Electronic Travel Declaration required from September 2025	✓
Lebanon	Visa on arrival	1 month	1 month extendable for 2 additional months; Granted free of charge at Beirut International Airport or any other port of entry if there is no Israeli visa or seal, holding a telephone number, an address in Lebanon, and a non refundable return or circle trip ticket.	X
Lesotho	Visa not required	90 days		X
Liberia	eVisa			✓
Libya	eVisa			✓
Liechtenstein	Visa not required	3 months	90 days during 180 days period following the date of first entry in the Schengen Area;	✓
Lithuania	Visa not required	3 months	90 days during 180 days period following the date of first entry in the Schengen Area;	✓
Luxembourg	Visa not required	3 months	90 days during 180 days period following the date of first entry in the Schengen Area;	✓
Madagascar	eVisa / Visa on arrival	90 days		X
Malawi	Visa not required	90 days		✓
Malaysia	Visa not required	30 days		✓
Maldives	Visa on arrival	30 days		✓
Mali	Visa required			✓
Malta	Visa not required	3 months	90 days during 180 days period following the date of first entry in the Schengen Area;	✓
Marshall Islands	Visa on arrival	90 days		X
Mauritania	eVisa		Available at Nouakchott–Oumtounsy International Airport.	X
Mauritius	Visa not required	90 days		✓
Mexico	Visa required		Citizens of Saint Kitts and Nevis who hold a valid non-immigrant U.S. visa are allowed into Mexico for a period of 180 days.	X
Micronesia	Visa not required	30 days		X
Moldova	Visa not required	90 days	90 days within any 180 day period	✓
Monaco	Visa not required			✓
Mongolia	eVisa			✓
Montenegro	Visa not required	90 days		X
Morocco	Visa required		May apply for an e-Visa if holding a valid visa or a residency document issued by one of the following countries: Schengen Area, Australia, Canada, Ireland, New Zealand, United Kingdom, United States a residency document issued by Cyprus, Japan, United Arab Emirates	✓
Mozambique	eVisa/Visa on arrival	30 days		X
Myanmar	Visa required			✓
Namibia	eVisa			✓
Nauru	Visa required		Visa Issuance: Passengers with an entry permit letter (visa letter) issued by Nauru. Applications can be submitted via email before departure	✓
Nepal	eVisa/Visa on arrival	90 days	Not available at all entry points.	X
Netherlands	Visa not required	3 months	90 days during 180 days period following the date of first entry in the Schengen Area;	✓
New Zealand	Visa required		Holders of an Australian Permanent Resident Visa or Resident Return Visa may be granted a New Zealand Resident Visa on arrival permitting indefinite stay (pursuant to the Trans-Tasman Travel Arrangement), subject to meeting character requirements and obtaining an Electronic Travel Authority prior to departure.	X
Nicaragua	Visa not required	90 days		✓
Niger	Visa required			✓
Nigeria	Visa not required	90 days		✓
North Macedonia	Visa not required	90 days		X
Norway	Visa not required	3 months	90 days during 180 days period following the date of first entry in the Schengen Area;	✓
Oman	eVisa			✓
Pakistan	eVisa	90 days	Issued free of charge as of August 2024.	✓
Palau	Visa on arrival	30 days		X
Panama	Visa not required	3 months		✓
Papua New Guinea	Easy Visitor Permit	30 days		✓
Paraguay	Visa not required	90 days		✓
Peru	Visa not required	183 days		✓
Philippines	Visa not required	30 days		X
Poland	Visa not required	3 months	90 days during 180 days period following the date of first entry in the Schengen Area;	✓
Portugal	Visa not required	3 months	90 days during 180 days period following the date of first entry in the Schengen Area;	✓
Qatar	eVisa			X
Romania	Visa not required	3 months	90 days during 180 days period following the date of the first entry in the Schengen Area;	✓
Russia	Visa not required	90 days	90 days within any 180 day period	✓
Rwanda	Visa not required	30 days	Visa waiver agreement was signed in April 2018 and it is yet to come into force.	X
Saint Lucia	Freedom of movement	Freedom of movement for OECS states; ID card valid		✓
Saint Vincent and the Grenadines	Freedom of movement	Freedom of movement for OECS states; ID card valid		✓
Samoa	Entry Permit on arrival	60 days		X
San Marino	Visa not required			✓
São Tomé and Príncipe	Visa not required			✓
Saudi Arabia	eVisa / Visa on arrival			✓
Senegal	Visa on arrival	90 days		X
Serbia	Visa not required	90 days	90 days within any 180 day period	X
Seychelles	Visitor's Permit on arrival	3 months		✓
Sierra Leone	eVisa/Visa on arrival		An agreement on mutual visa-free visits for 90 days was signed in February 2017 and is yet to be ratified.	X
Singapore	Visa not required	30 days		✓
Slovakia	Visa not required	3 months	90 days during 180 days period following the date of first entry in the Schengen Area;	✓
Slovenia	Visa not required	3 months	90 days during 180 days period following the date of first entry in the Schengen Area;	✓
Solomon Islands	Visitor's Permit on arrival	3 months		✓
Somalia	eVisa	30 days	All visitors must have an approved Electronic Visa (eTAS) before the start of their journey.	X
South Africa	Visa required			X
South Sudan	Electronic Visa		Obtainable online; Printed visa authorization must be presented at the time of travel	X
Spain	Visa not required	3 months	90 days during 180 days period following the date of first entry in the Schengen Area;	✓
Sri Lanka	Electronic Travel Authorization	30 days	The standard visitor visa allows a stay of 60 days within any 6-month period.; Visa fees (for Standard visitor visa): SAARC - USD 35; Non SAARC - USD 75; e-Visa categories will be charged an additional USD 18.50 service fee.; If transiting from any of the Sri Lankan airports, An e-Visa is exempted (2 day transit period).	X
Sudan	Visa required		Can obtain a visa upon arrival if married to a national of Sudan or prove that are of Sudanese origins from the father's side.	✓
Suriname	Visa not required	6 months	Holders of Caricom Certificate of Skills can stay indefinitely.	✓
Sweden	Visa not required	3 months	90 days during 180 days period following the date of first entry in the Schengen Area;	✓
Switzerland	Visa not required	3 months	90 days during 180 days period following the date of first entry in the Schengen Area;	✓
Syria	eVisa			✓
Tajikistan	Visa not required	30 days	Visa also available online.	X
Tanzania	Visa not required	90 days		✓
Thailand	eVisa			✓
Timor-Leste	Visa on arrival	30 days	Not available at all entry points.	X
Togo	eVisa	7 days		X
Tonga	Visa on arrival	31 days		✓
Trinidad and Tobago	Visa not required	6 months	Holders of Caricom Certificate of Skills can stay indefinitely.	✓
Tunisia	Visa not required	3 months		X
Turkey	Visa required		please refer to the website of MOFA -Turkey.	X
Turkmenistan	Visa required		Visa Issuance: Passengers with a letter of invitation issued by a company registered in Turkmenistan and approved by the State Foreign Ministry of Turkmenistan can obtain a visa on arrival for a maximum stay of 10 days. They can apply to extend their stay for an additional 10 days	✓
Tuvalu	Visa not required	90 days		✓
Uganda	eVisa		Determined at the port of entry. May apply online.	✓
Ukraine	Visa not required	90 days	90 days within any 180 day period	✓
United Arab Emirates	eVisa			✓
United Kingdom	Electronic Travel Authorisation	6 months		✓
United States	Visa required			X
Uruguay	Visa not required	90 days		✓
Uzbekistan	Visa not required	30 days		X
Vanuatu	Visa not required	120 days		✓
Vatican City	Visa not required	90 days	Open borders but de facto follows Italian visa policy.	✓
Venezuela	Visa not required	90 days		✓
Vietnam	eVisa	90 days	30 days visa-free when visiting Phú Quốc	✓
Yemen	Visa required		Saint Kitts and Nevis citizens of Yemeni origin with a Yemeni identification document or proof of Yemeni origin do not need a visa.	✓
Zambia	Visa not required	90 days		✓
Zimbabwe	Visa not required	90 days	Strictly tourism purposes only.	X

=== Dependent, Disputed, or Restricted territories ===
Unrecognized or partially recognized countries

Territory	Conditions of access	Notes
Abkhazia	Visa required	
Kosovo	Visa not required	90 days
Northern Cyprus	Visa not required	
Palestine	Visa not required	Arrival by sea to Gaza Strip not allowed.
Sahrawi Arab Democratic Republic		Undefined visa regime in the Western Sahara controlled territory.
Somaliland	Visa on arrival	30 days for 30 US dollars, payable on arrival.
South Ossetia	Visa not required	Multiple entry visa to Russia and three day prior notification are required to enter South Ossetia.
Taiwan	Visa not required	30 days. Nationals of St. Kitts and Nevis born in Afghanistan, China (People's Rep.), Iran, Iraq, Libya, Nigeria, Pakistan, Syria and Yemen must have a visa.
Transnistria	Visa not required	Registration required after 24h.

Dependent and autonomous territories

Territory	Conditions of access	Notes
China
Hong Kong	Visa not required	90 days
Macau	Visa on arrival	
Denmark
Faroe Islands	Visa not required	
Greenland	Visa not required	
France
French Guiana	Visa not required	
French Polynesia	Visa not required	
(France) French West Indies	Visa not required	Includes overseas departments of Guadeloupe and Martinique and overseas collectivities of Saint Barthélemy and Saint Martin.
Mayotte	Visa not required	
New Caledonia	Visa not required	
Réunion	Visa not required	
Saint Pierre and Miquelon	Visa not required	
Wallis and Futuna	Visa not required	
Netherlands
Aruba	Visa not required	
Caribbean Netherlands	Visa not required	Includes Bonaire, Sint Eustatius and Saba.
Curaçao	Visa not required	
Sint Maarten	Visa not required	
New Zealand
Cook Islands	Visa not required	31 days
Niue	Visa not required	30 days
Tokelau	Visa required	
United Kingdom
Akrotiri and Dhekelia	Visa not required	Stays longer than 28 days per 12-month period require a permit.
Anguilla	Visa not required	Holders of a valid visa issued by the United Kingdom do not require a visa.
Bermuda	Visa not required	
British Indian Ocean Territory	Special permit required	Special permit required.
British Virgin Islands	Visa not required	
Cayman Islands	Visa not required	
Falkland Islands	Visa required	
Gibraltar	Visa not required	
Guernsey	Visa not required	
Isle of Man	Visa not required	
Jersey	Visa not required	
Montserrat	Visa not required	
Pitcairn Islands	Visa not required	14 days visa free and landing fee US$35 or tax of US$5 if not going ashore.
Ascension Island	eVisa	3 months within any year period
Saint Helena	Visitor's Pass required	Visitor's Pass granted on arrival valid for 4/10/21/60/90 days for 12/14/16/20/25 pound sterling.
Tristan da Cunha	Permission required	Permission to land required for 15/30 pounds sterling (yacht/ship passenger) for Tristan da Cunha Island or 20 pounds sterling for Gough Island, Inaccessible Island or Nightingale Islands.
South Georgia and the South Sandwich Islands	Permit required	Pre-arrival permit from the Commissioner required (72 hours/1 month for 110/160 pounds sterling).
Turks and Caicos Islands	Visa not required	Holders of a valid visa issued by Canada, United Kingdom or the USA do not required a visa for a maximum stay of 90 days.
United States
American Samoa	Visa required	
Guam	Visa required	
Northern Mariana Islands	Visa required	
Puerto Rico	Visa required	
U.S. Virgin Islands	Visa required	
Antarctica and adjacent islands
Special permits required for Bouvet Island, British Antarctic Territory, French Southern and Antarctic Lands, Argentine Antarctica, (Australia) Australian Antarctic Territory, (Antártica Chilena Province) Chilean Antarctic Territory, (Australia) Heard Island and McDonald Islands, (Norway) Peter I Island, (Norway) Queen Maud Land, (New Zealand) Ross Dependency.

== Additional Rules ==
=== Visa exemption for Schengen States ===
St. Kitts and Nevis citizens are classified as 'Annex II' foreign nationals, and so are permitted to stay visa-free in the 27 member states of the Schengen Area as a whole — rather than each country individually — for a period not exceeding 3 months every 6 months. ETIAS will be required for entry starting 2025.

=== Visa exemption in CARICOM States ===
St. Kitts and Nevis citizens wishing to live and work in another CARICOM State should obtain a CSME Skills Certificate. This must be presented at Immigration in the receiving country along with a valid passport and a police certificate of character. Holders of certificates are given a maximum of six months stay in the host country until their status and documents could be verified. Additional documents are required if travelling with spouse and/or dependants such as Marriage certificate , Birth Certificate, etc.

=== Visa exemption in OECS States ===
Citizens of St. Kitts and Nevis can live and work in Antigua and Barbuda, Dominica, Grenada, Saint Lucia and Saint Vincent and the Grenadines as a result of right of freedom of movement granted in Article 12 of the Protocol of the Eastern Caribbean Economic Union of the Revised Treaty of Basseterre.

=== Visa exemption and requirements for the United Kingdom ===
St. Kitts and Nevis citizens are able to visit the United Kingdom for up to 6 months (or 3 months if they enter from Ireland) without the need to apply for a visa as long as they fulfil all of the following criteria:

- they do not work during their stay in the UK
- they must not register a marriage or register a civil partnership during their stay in the UK
- they can present evidence of sufficient money to fund their stay in the UK (if requested by the border inspection officer)
- they intend to leave the UK at the end of their visit and can meet the cost of the return/onward journey
- they have completed a landing card and submitted it at passport control unless in direct transit to a destination outside the Common Travel Area
- if under the age of 18, they can demonstrate evidence of suitable care arrangements and parental (or guardian's) consent for their stay in the UK

However, even though, strictly speaking, he/she is not required to apply for a visa if he/she satisfies all of the above criteria, a St. Kitts and Nevis citizen who falls into any of the following categories has been strongly advised by the UK Border Agency (replaced by UK Visas and Immigration) to apply for a visa prior to travelling to the UK:

- he/she has any unspent criminal convictions in any country
- he/she has previously been refused or breached the terms of any entry to the UK, or been deported or otherwise removed from the UK
- he/she has previously applied for a visa and been refused one
- he/she has been warned by a UK official that he/she should obtain a visa before travelling to the UK

St. Kitts and Nevis citizens with a grandparent born either in the United Kingdom, Channel Islands or Isle of Man at any time or in Ireland on or before 31 March 1922 can apply for UK Ancestry Entry Clearance, which enables them to work in the UK for 5 years, after which they can apply to settle indefinitely.

== Consular protection of St. Kitts and Nevis citizens abroad ==
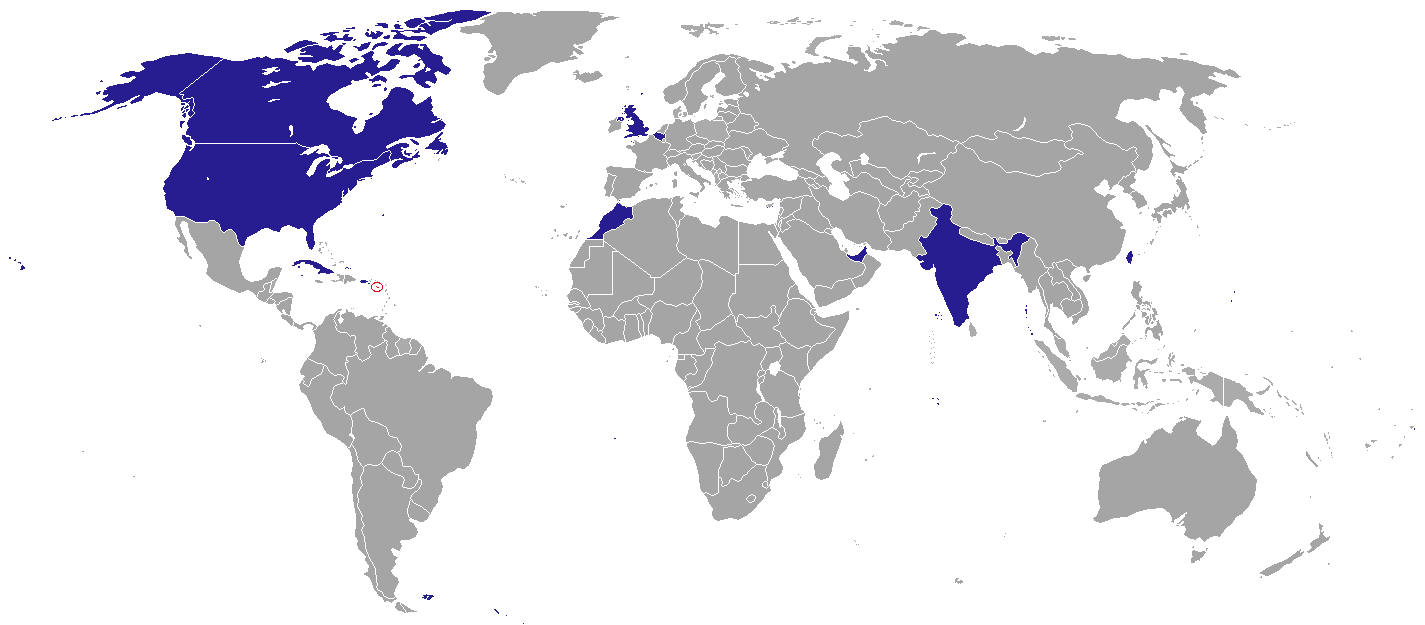
Diplomatic missions of Saint Kitts and Nevis

St. Kitts and Nevis citizens who require consular assistance in a foreign country where there is no St. Kitts and Nevis foreign mission may be able to request assistance from a British Embassy, high commission or consulate. For example, a citizen of St. Kitts and Nevis who need to travel urgently and whose passport has expired, been lost or stolen can be issued with an emergency travel document by a British foreign mission as long as this has cleared with the Ministry of Foreign Affairs of Saint Kitts and Nevis. See List of diplomatic missions of Saint Kitts and Nevis.

== See also ==
- Visa policy of Saint Kitts and Nevis
- Arab League boycott of Israel – passport restrictions
