= Coat of arms of Saint Kitts and Nevis =

National coat of arms of the Federation of Saint Christopher and Nevis

Versions
- Coat of arms used by the former colony of Saint Christopher-Nevis-Anguilla (1967-1983)
- Armiger: Saint Kitts and Nevis
- Adopted: 1983
- Supporters: Pelicans
- Motto: Country Above Self
- Earlier version(s): Saint Christopher-Nevis-Anguilla
- Use: 1958-1967

The coat of arms of Saint Kitts and Nevis was adopted in 1983 and possesses the motto "Country Above Self". The previous coat of arms, adopted in 1967 by the colony of Saint Christopher-Nevis-Anguilla, was nearly identical, except for colouration and the motto "Unity in Trinity".

The centre of the coat of arms is dominated by a shield at the base in which there is a lighter in full sail (one of the traditional means of transportation). A red chevron is highlighted by two poinciana flowers.

At the top of the shield is a Carib's head, flanked by a fleur-de-lis and a rose. The Caribs were the early inhabitants of the islands, and the fleur-de-lis and rose signify the islands' French and British influences. A helmet topped with the battlements of a tower appears with a flaming torch upheld by three hands: one African, one European and one Indian. The torch signifies the struggle and quest for freedom by a people of diverse ethnic origins, but united in purpose.

The shield is supported on either side by pelicans (the country's national bird), with wings extended, displaying a sugar cane plant and the coconut palm tree, which are extensively cultivated throughout Saint Kitts and Nevis.

== Seal of Nevis ==
The island of Nevis uses a seal presenting the national coat of arms on a white background in a yellow roundel with the text "Nevis Island Administration" capitalised.

== Gallery ==
Coat of arms of the British Leeward Islands (1909–1940), with the two shields in the centre representing Saint Christopher and Nevis respectively

Coat of arms of the British Leeward Islands (1940–1956)
