= Foreign relations of Saint Kitts and Nevis =

Saint Kitts and Nevis is an island nation in the Caribbean. Its ties with CARICOM and its proximity to South and North America have allowed strong diplomatic ties with several nations.

== Diplomatic relations ==
List of countries which Saint Kitts and Nevis maintains diplomatic relations with:

#	Country	Date
1	Antigua and Barbuda	19 September 1983
2	Barbados	19 September 1983
3	Grenada	19 September 1983
4	Jamaica	19 September 1983
5	Saint Lucia	19 September 1983
6	Saint Vincent and the Grenadines	19 September 1983
7	South Korea	19 September 1983
8	Trinidad and Tobago	19 September 1983
9	United Kingdom	19 September 1983
10	United States	20 September 1983
11	Belize	21 September 1983
—	Republic of China	23 September 1983
12	Canada	11 October 1983
13	Venezuela	31 October 1983
14	India	22 December 1983
15	Dominica	1983
16	Colombia	1 January 1984
17	Israel	January 1984
18	France	17 July 1984
19	Netherlands	16 August 1984
20	Germany	27 August 1984
21	Japan	14 January 1985
22	Brazil	12 March 1985
23	Australia	6 February 1986
24	Thailand	16 January 1987
25	Spain	19 March 1987
26	Uruguay	15 July 1987
27	Argentina	7 December 1988
28	Denmark	23 March 1989
29	Chile	1989
30	Mexico	31 July 1990
31	Seychelles	12 December 1991
32	North Korea	13 December 1991
33	Sweden	3 April 1992
34	Nicaragua	May 1992
35	Costa Rica	11 June 1992
36	Singapore	1 July 1992
37	Malaysia	30 July 1992
38	El Salvador	15 October 1992
39	Norway	15 October 1992
40	Switzerland	17 November 1992
41	Panama	19 November 1992
42	Bahamas	1992
43	Guatemala	1992
44	Ghana	June 1993
45	Portugal	1 March 1995
46	Azerbaijan	22 March 1995
47	Cuba	10 May 1995
48	Italy	7 January 1996
49	South Africa	25 February 1998
—	Holy See	19 July 1999
50	Austria	1999
51	Philippines	11 August 2000
52	Russia	22 September 2003
53	Iceland	5 May 2004
54	Belgium	7 July 2004
55	Greece	9 July 2004
56	Malta	25 November 2005
57	Algeria	1 October 2007
58	Morocco	2 October 2007
59	Slovakia	26 September 2008
60	Slovenia	5 June 2009
61	Latvia	8 June 2009
62	Luxembourg	18 June 2009
63	Poland	23 June 2009
64	Botswana	25 June 2009
65	Romania	25 June 2009
66	Finland	22 September 2009
67	Estonia	23 September 2009
68	Czech Republic	18 February 2010
69	Monaco	21 April 2010
70	Turkey	3 June 2010
71	United Arab Emirates	16 June 2010
72	Liechtenstein	2010
73	Hungary	11 May 2011
74	Suriname	11 October 2011
75	Georgia	26 October 2011
76	Lithuania	26 September 2012
77	Montenegro	19 October 2012
78	Kuwait	16 November 2012
79	Paraguay	22 March 2013
80	Kazakhstan	8 May 2013
81	New Zealand	20 September 2013
82	Vietnam	1 November 2013
83	Indonesia	30 January 2014
84	Fiji	16 May 2014
85	Ukraine	8 June 2015
—	Kosovo	4 March 2016
86	Cyprus	8 March 2016
87	Mongolia	12 April 2016
88	Senegal	27 April 2016
89	Croatia	27 May 2016
90	Belarus	4 June 2016
91	Gambia	6 June 2016
92	Dominican Republic	21 September 2016
93	Maldives	21 September 2016
94	Kenya	22 September 2016
95	Saudi Arabia	29 September 2016
96	Mauritius	25 November 2016
97	Bolivia	25 January 2017
98	Brunei	21 February 2017
99	Ethiopia	1 March 2017
100	Ecuador	15 March 2017
101	Turkmenistan	31 May 2017
102	Qatar	16 August 2017
103	Moldova	8 September 2017
104	Armenia	21 September 2017
105	Laos	23 September 2017
106	Mozambique	9 November 2017
107	Gabon	5 January 2018
108	Nepal	30 May 2018
109	Eswatini	7 June 2018
110	Tajikistan	7 June 2018
111	Kyrgyzstan	8 June 2018
112	San Marino	25 September 2018
113	Togo	25 September 2018
114	Bahrain	27 September 2018
115	Sao Tome and Principe	28 September 2018
116	Albania	31 October 2018
117	Serbia	6 November 2018
118	Cambodia	16 November 2018
119	Marshall Islands	18 December 2018
120	Rwanda	15 February 2019
121	Honduras	26 June 2019
—	State of Palestine	29 July 2019
122	North Macedonia	12 September 2019
123	Bosnia and Herzegovina	6 December 2019
124	Djibouti	20 February 2020
125	Bangladesh	31 August 2020
126	Jordan	9 December 2020
127	Sri Lanka	22 March 2021
128	Cameroon	9 June 2021
129	Egypt	21 September 2021
130	Burkina Faso	10 October 2021
131	Zimbabwe	30 November 2021
132	Sudan	24 February 2022
133	Uzbekistan	9 March 2022
134	Uganda	1 April 2022
135	Tuvalu	4 April 2022
136	Benin	2 June 2022
137	Andorra	21 September 2022
138	Peru	24 April 2023
139	Ireland	16 June 2023
140	Equatorial Guinea	22 September 2023
141	Pakistan	25 January 2024
142	Cape Verde	10 May 2024
143	Palau	21 May 2024
144	Lebanon	24 July 2024
145	Comoros	28 September 2024
146	Oman	12 August 2025
147	Namibia	22 September 2026
148	Guyana	Unknown
149	Haiti	Unknown
150	Nigeria	Unknown

== Table ==
=== Americas ===
Country	Formal Relations Began	Notes
United States	1983	See Saint Kitts and Nevis–United States relations: United States maintains a diplomatic presence through its embassy in Barbados and consulate in Antigua.
Mexico	31 July 1990	See Mexico–Saint Kitts and Nevis relations: Mexico is accredited to Saint Kitts and Nevis from its embassy in Castries, Saint Lucia and maintains an honorary consulate in Basseterre.; Saint Kitts and Nevis is accredited to Mexico from its embassy in Washington, D.C., United States.

=== Asia ===
Country	Formal Relations Began	Notes
India	1983	See India–Saint Kitts and Nevis relations
South Korea	19 September 1983	The two countries have good relations.
Turkey		Turkish Embassy in Santo Domingo is accredited to St. Kitts and Nevis.; Trade volume between the two countries was 5.9 million USD in 2019.

=== Europe ===
Country	Formal Relations Began	Notes
Germany	27 August 1984	St. Kitts and Nevis is represented in Germany through its High Commission in the United Kingdom.; Germany is represented in St. Kitts and Nevis through its embassy in Trinidad and Tobago.
United Kingdom	19 September 1983	See Saint Kitts and Nevis–United Kingdom relations Saint Kitts and Nevis established diplomatic relations with the United Kingdom on 19 September 1983. Both countries are Commonwealth Realms.: Saint Kitts and Nevis maintains a high commission in London.; The United Kingdom is accredited to Saint Kitts and Nevis from its high commission in Bridgetown; there is no British high commission in Saint Kitts and Nevis.; The UK governed Saint Kitts and Nevis from the 17th century to 1983, when Saint Kitts and Nevis achieved full independence. Both countries share common membership of the Caribbean Development Bank, the Commonwealth, the International Criminal Court, and the World Trade Organization, as well as the CARIFORUM–UK Economic Partnership Agreement.

=== Oceania ===
Country	Formal Relations Began	Notes
Australia	6 February 1986	Australia and Saint Kitts and Nevis enjoy good relations, with political links through shared membership of the Commonwealth of Nations and sporting ties, particularly cricket. Formal diplomatic relations were established with the presentation of credentials of Australia's first non-resident high commissioner on 6 February 1986.; Australia is accredited to St Kitts and Nevis from its High Commission in Port of Spain, Trinidad and Tobago.; St Kitts and Nevis have not yet established diplomatic representation in Australia.

== See also ==
- Ministry of Foreign Affairs (Saint Kitts and Nevis)
- List of diplomatic missions in Saint Kitts and Nevis
- List of diplomatic missions of Saint Kitts and Nevis
