= Sun Xiang (businessman) =

Chinese businessman

- 孙翔
- Born: 1982 (age 43–44); China
- Education: University of Queensland
- Occupation: Businessman
- Known for: President of Hebei Sinogiant Group and one of the richest families in China
- Title: President, Hebei Sinogiant Group

Sun Xiang (Chinese: 孙翔; pinyin: Sūn Xiáng; born 1982) is a Chinese businessman who serves as president of Hebei Sinogiant Group, also known as Xinhua Metallurgical Holding Group, a private steel and industrial conglomerate based in Hebei. He was ranked 269th on the Forbes China Rich List in 2015, with an estimated fortune of US$1.12 billion.

== Biography ==
Sun was born in 1982 and holds an MBA from the University of Queensland.

Sun served as a member of the Hebei Provincial Committee of the Chinese People's Political Consultative Conference from 2010 to 2012 and was later elected a deputy to the 12th and 13th Hebei Provincial People's Congresses. In August 2019, the Tangshan Municipal People's Congress confirmed that Sun had held citizenship of Saint Kitts and Nevis since 2011 and was handling the matter in accordance with legal procedure as the Nationality Law of the People's Republic of China does not recognise dual nationality. Later, the Tangshan Municipal People's Congress Standing Committee voted to remove him from his seat as a deputy to the 13th Hebei Provincial People's Congress.

== Wealth ==
Forbes ranked Sun and his family 269th on its 2015 China Rich List and estimated their wealth at US$1.12 billion.
