= Qian Zhimin =

Qian Zhimin may refer to:

- Qian Zhimin (born 1960) (钱智民), nuclear specialist and politician
- Qian Zhimin (criminal) (钱志敏), fraudster who attempted to launder with bitcoin in UK
