= Visa policy of Saint Kitts and Nevis =

Policy on permits required to enter Saint Kitts and Nevis

Visitors to Saint Kitts and Nevis must obtain an e-Visa unless they are citizens from one of the visa-exempt countries or citizens who must obtain an Electronic Travel Authorisation (eTA).

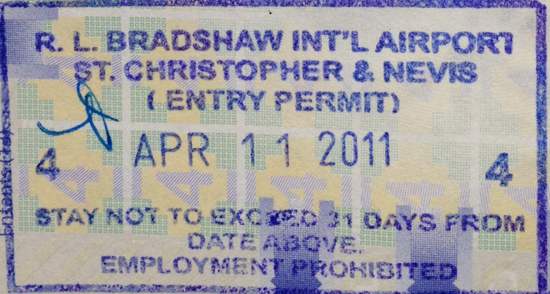
Entry stamp

== Visa policy map ==
Visa policy of Saint Kitts and Nevis Saint Kitts and Nevis Freedom of movement Electronic Travel Authorisation (eTA) eVisa

== Visa exemption ==
=== Freedom of movement ===
Citizens of the Organisation of Eastern Caribbean States (OECS) have the right to reside and work indefinitely in Saint Kitts and Nevis without any restrictions:

- Antigua and Barbuda
- Dominica
- Grenada
- Montserrat
- Saint Lucia
- Saint Vincent and the Grenadines

Citizens and residents of Saint Kitts and Nevis and OECS Nationals are exempted from the eTA requirement but are required to complete and submit an Online Immigration and Customs ED Form.

== Electronic Travel Authorisation (eTA) ==
Saint Kitts and Nevis Electronic Border Management System
- Owner: Ministry of National Security
- Website: www.knatravelform.kn

Following the implementation of the Electronic Travel Authorisation (eTA) system on May 26, 2025, citizens of the following countries and territories may enter Saint Kitts and Nevis as tourists if they have an eTA before they start their journey, for stays up to the duration below. A single-entry eTA is valid for 90 days for USD 17. There is no multiple-entry eTA.

6 months

- Bahamas
- Barbados
- Belize
- Canada
- Guyana
- Jamaica
- Suriname
- Trinidad and Tobago
- United Kingdom
- United States

90 days

- All European Union member states

- Albania
- Argentina
- Australia
- Bahrain
- Bangladesh
- Bolivia
- Botswana
- Brazil
- Brunei
- Chile
- Colombia
- Costa Rica
- Cuba
- Ecuador
- Egypt
- El Salvador
- Eswatini
- Fiji
- Gambia
- Georgia
- Ghana
- Guatemala
- Honduras
- Iceland
- India
- Israel
- Japan
- Jordan
- Kazakhstan
- Kenya
- Kiribati
- Kuwait
- Lesotho
- Liechtenstein
- Malawi
- Malaysia
- Maldives
- Malta
- Mauritius
- Mexico
- Moldova
- Monaco
- Nauru
- New Zealand
- Nicaragua
- Nigeria
- North Macedonia
- Norway
- Panama
- Papua New Guinea
- Paraguay
- Peru
- Qatar
- Russia
- Rwanda
- San Marino
- Saudi Arabia
- Serbia
- Seychelles
- Sierra Leone
- Singapore
- Solomon Islands
- South Africa
- South Korea
- Sri Lanka
- Switzerland
- Tanzania
- Tonga
- Turkey
- Tuvalu
- Uganda
- Ukraine
- United Arab Emirates
- Uruguay
- Vanuatu
- Vatican City
- Venezuela
- Zambia
- Zimbabwe

3 months

- Hong Kong
- Taiwan

30 days

- Belarus
- China
- Indonesia
- Kosovo

1 month

- Macau

According to IATA, citizens of the following countries must obtain an e-Visa. However, the Ministry of Foreign Affairs does not name these countries on the list of countries that need visas to travel to Saint Kitts and Nevis:

- Marshall Islands
- Montenegro
- Morocco
- Oman
- South Sudan
- Sudan
- Togo

=== eTA-exempt ===
Cruise ship passengers may enter Saint Kitts and Nevis without a visa for a day without an eTA.

=== Future changes ===
Saint Kitts and Nevis has signed visa exemption agreements with the following countries, but they have not yet been ratified:

Country	Passports	Agreement signed on
Sudan	All	24 February 2022
Marshall Islands	All	29 October 2019
Togo	All	22 March 2019

== Electronic visa (e-Visa) ==
St. Kitts and Nevis eVisa
- Owner: Ministry of National Security
- Website: evisa.stkittsnevisonline.com

Citizens from countries that require a visa for Saint Kitts and Nevis can apply for an e-Visa. With a printed approval they are issued a visa on arrival by an Immigration Officer for a fee of USD 100. The maximum length of stay is 30 days.

== See also ==
- Visa requirements for Saint Kitts and Nevis citizens
