= Colombia–Saint Kitts and Nevis relations =

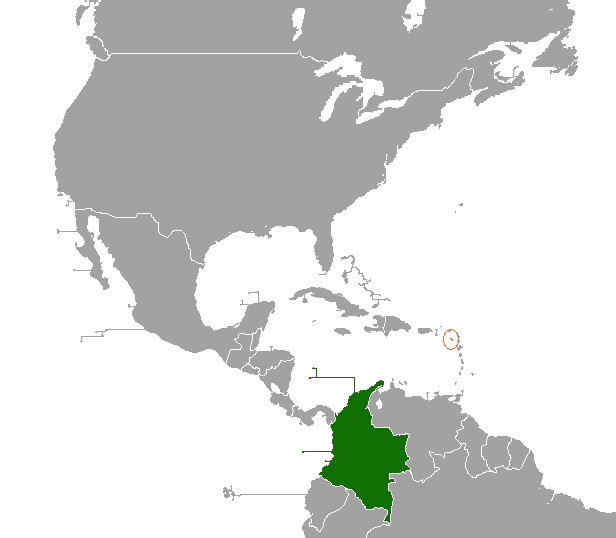
- Colombia: Saint Kitts and Nevis

Diplomatic mission
- Embassy of Colombia in Kingston: Embassy of Saint Christopher in Caracas

Colombia–Saint Kitts and Nevis relations are the bilateral relations between Colombia and Saint Kitts and Nevis. Both countries have maintained a friendly relationship since the late 20th century. The two nations are members of the Association of Caribbean States, Community of Latin American and Caribbean States, Organization of American States and the United Nations.

== History ==
Both governments established diplomatic relations in 1984. On 14 January 2019, Colombian foreign minister Carlos Holmes Trujillo met with the former foreign minister of Saint Kitts and Nevis Mark Brantley, where issues on the bilateral agenda were reviewed. On 27 October 2021, Mark Brantley met with the vice president and foreign minister of Colombia Marta Lucia Ramírez discussing about the issues of bilateral and multilateral relevance between the two nations, which were related to climate change, climate finance, greater collaboration in security, culture and language, and a vision for a comprehensive Caribbean/Latin American political and economic union. In August 2022, Colombia further enhanced ties with Saint Kitts and Nevis to promote a wide variety of programmes.

== High-level visits ==
High-level visits from Colombia to Saint Kitts and Nevis

- Americas Director Patricia Cortés Ortiz (2017)

== Trade ==
In 2022, Saint Kitts and Nevis exported $69k to Colombia. The products exported from Saint Kitts and Nevis to Colombia included low-voltage protection equipment ($59.8k), other measuring instruments ($8.56k), and iron fasteners ($372). Colombia exported $506k to Saint Kitts and Nevis. The products exported from Colombia to Saint Kitts and Nevis consisted of raw sugar ($213k), baked goods ($123k), and trunks and cases ($63.8k).

== Diplomatic missions ==
Neither country has a resident ambassador.

- Colombia uses its embassy in Kingston as a concurrent embassy to Saint Kitts and Nevis.
- Saint Kitts and Nevis uses its embassy in Caracas as a concurrent embassy to Colombia.

== See also ==
- Foreign relations of Colombia
- Foreign relations of Saint Kitts and Nevis
