= Saint Kitts and Nevis–United Kingdom relations =

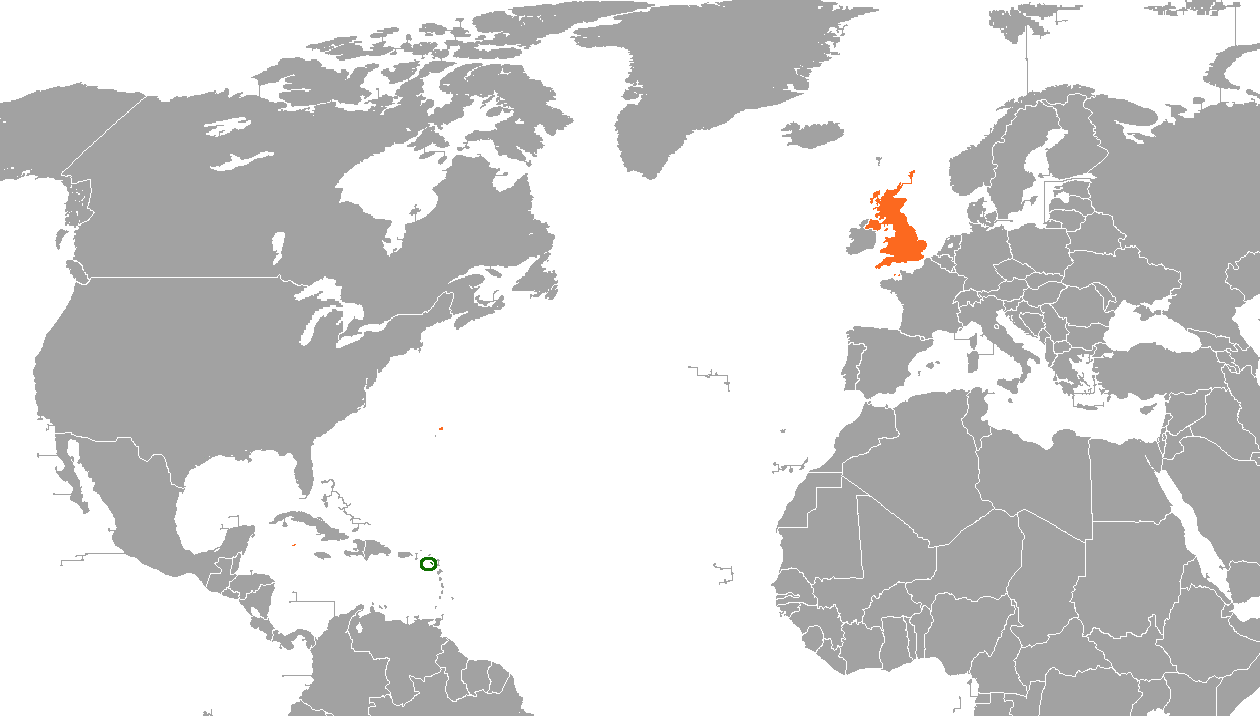

- Saint Kitts and Nevis: United Kingdom

Saint Kitts and Nevis and the United Kingdom have a long history of colonial activity and later diplomatic relations.

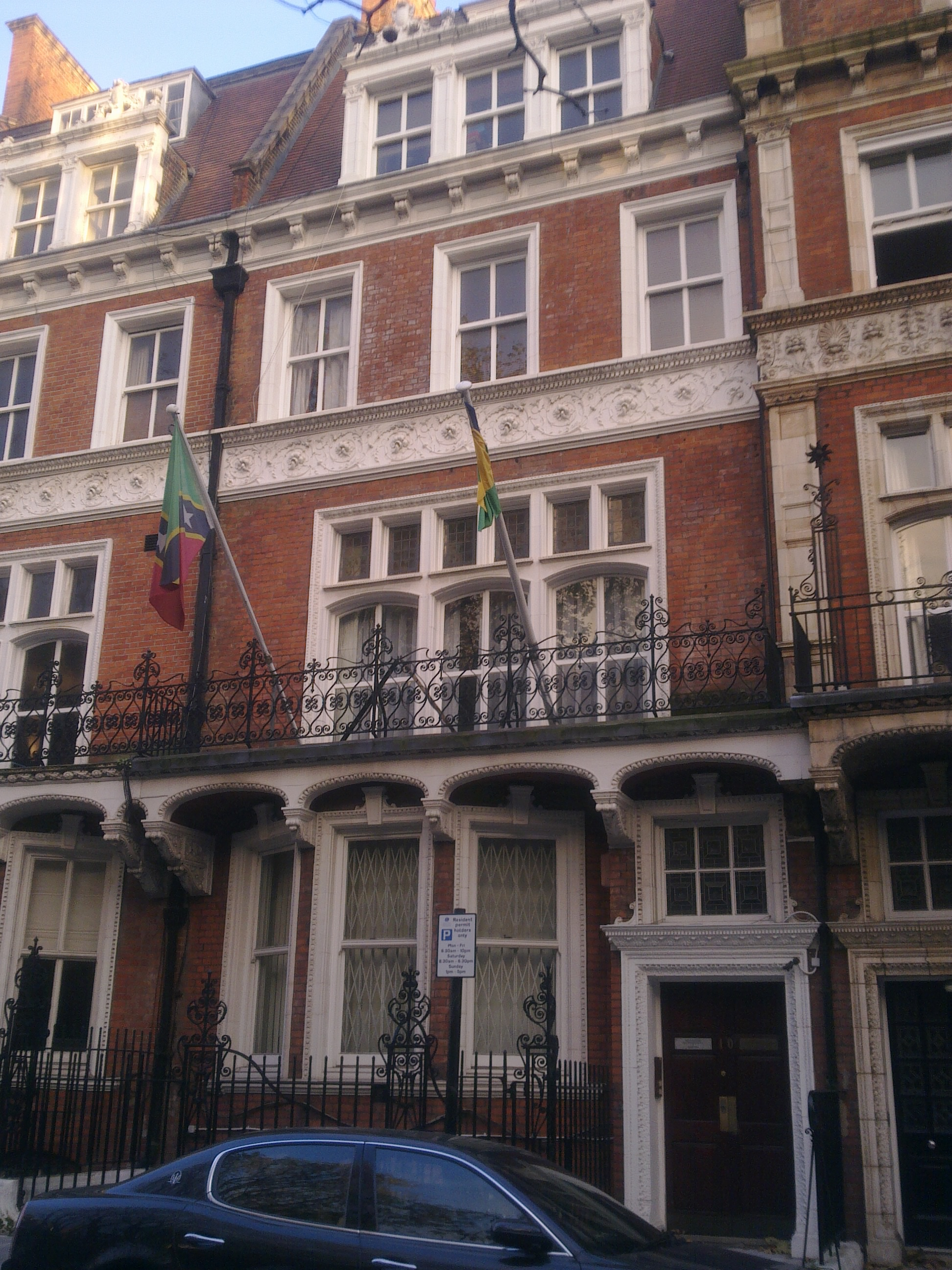
High Commission of Saint Kitts and Nevis in London

During the late 17th century, France and England battled for control over Saint Kitts. It was ceded to Britain on 11 April 1713 in the Treaty of Utrecht. Saint Kitts and Nevis, along with Anguilla, became an associated state with full internal autonomy in 1967 as Saint Christopher-Nevis-Anguilla. Anguillians rebelled, and separated from the others in 1971. Saint Kitts and Nevis achieved independence in 1983.

Saint Kitts and Nevis maintains a High Commission in South Kensington in London. In turn, the United Kingdom maintains a High Commission in Bridgetown, Barbados which also serves as High Commission to Saint Kitts and Nevis.

Kevin Isaac is the current High Commissioner to the United Kingdom since January 2011. Scott Furssedonn-Wood is the current non-resident High Commissioner to Saints Kitts and Nevis since April 2021.

== See also ==
- Foreign relations of Saint Kitts and Nevis
- Foreign relations of the United Kingdom
