= Qian Zhimin (criminal) =

Chinese fraudster and money launderer (born 1978)

- Born: 4 September 1978 (age 48); Rugao, China
- Other names: Zhang Yadi (张雅迪); Hua Hua (花花) "Cryptoqueen" (加密女王)
- Status: Imprisoned (as of November 2025)
- Criminal charges: Acquiring criminal property; possessing criminal property (under the Proceeds of Crime Act 2002)
- Penalty: 11 years and 8 months' imprisonment

Qian Zhimin (Chinese: 钱志敏; pinyin: Qián Zhìmǐn; born 4 September 1978), also known as Zhang Yadi (张雅迪), is a Chinese fraudster convicted in the United Kingdom for her role in one of the largest cryptocurrency money laundering cases in history. Between 2014 and 2017, Qian orchestrated a Ponzi scheme in China through her company Tianjin Lantian Gerui Electronic Technology Co Ltd (蓝天格锐; "Blue Sky Greet"), defrauding more than 128,000 investors of approximately 40 billion yuan (£4.2 billion). She fled China in 2017 using a forged passport and settled in London, where she attempted to launder the proceeds—stored as Bitcoin – through luxury property purchases. The Metropolitan Police ultimately seized over 61,000 Bitcoin, valued at more than £5 billion at the time of recovery, described as the largest single cryptocurrency seizure by law enforcement in the United Kingdom.

Qian pleaded guilty to two offences under the Proceeds of Crime Act 2002 at Southwark Crown Court on 29 September 2025 and was sentenced on 11 November 2025 to 11 years and 8 months' imprisonment.

== The Lantian Gerui fraud ==
In 2014, Qian founded Tianjin Lantian Gerui Electronic Technology Co Ltd in Tianjin, China. The company claimed to develop advanced health technology products and to mine cryptocurrency, promising investors annual returns of up to 300 percent. In reality, the company operated as a Ponzi scheme: returns paid to existing investors were funded by deposits from new recruits rather than from any genuine business activity. Investors received daily payouts that increased for each new participant they recruited, giving the scheme characteristics of a pyramid scheme.

The scheme attracted investors from every province of China, many of whom were middle-aged or elderly and invested their life savings and pensions. Lantian Gerui staged large meetings and banquets for prospective and current investors, and at least one event was held at the Diaoyutai State Guesthouse in Beijing. Total investor deposits were estimated by the Crown Prosecution Service at more than 40 billion yuan (approximately £4.2 billion), with direct financial losses of approximately £600 million. In June 2014, Qian opened an account at the Huobi cryptocurrency exchange and began converting investor funds into Bitcoin.

Over 80 people in China received criminal convictions in connection with the Lantian Gerui fraud.

== Flight from China ==
By the time Chinese police opened their investigation in mid-2017, over 70,000 Bitcoin had been transferred from the exchange to a digital wallet stored on a laptop. Qian paid off senior managers to reassure investors that the interruption in payouts was temporary, while she prepared to flee the country.

On 26 July 2017, Qian left China using a forged St Kitts and Nevis passport issued in the name "Yadi Zhang" and arrived in the United Kingdom on 16 September 2017 via a circuitous route through Southeast Asia. The laptop itself was separately smuggled into the UK: her later accomplice Jian Wen collected it from Thailand on 20 October 2017, and retrieved a second laptop on 29 November 2017.

Qian was the subject of an Interpol Red Notice issued at the request of Chinese authorities.

== Life in the United Kingdom ==
=== Hampstead and attempted property purchases ===
Upon arriving in London, Qian rented a mansion on the edge of Hampstead Heath at a cost of more than £17,000 per month. She posed as a wealthy antiques and diamond heiress and hired Jian Wen, a former Chinese takeaway worker from Leeds, as her personal assistant and English-language interpreter. With Wen acting as the English-speaking "front person", the pair attempted to purchase high-value London properties worth £4.5 million, £23.5 million, and £12.5 million, but were repeatedly thwarted by know your customer requirements under anti-money laundering regulations when Wen could not explain the source of the funds.

Qian's diary, later seized by police, outlined a six-year plan with grandiose ambitions, including founding an international bank, acquiring a castle in Sweden, cultivating relationships with British aristocracy, receiving an anointment from the Dalai Lama, and becoming the monarch of Liberland, an unrecognised micronation on the Danube between Croatia and Serbia. According to testimony given at Wen's trial, Qian spent most of her days in bed playing video games, shopping online, and exchanging Bitcoin, while Wen managed day-to-day affairs.

=== Police raids and seizure of Bitcoin ===
In September 2018, the Metropolitan Police received intelligence about the attempted conversion of criminal assets in London. Qian's attempt to purchase a £12.5 million property in Totteridge Common triggered a formal investigation when Wen failed to satisfy anti-money laundering checks conducted by law firm Mishcon de Reya.

=== Evasion and arrest ===
Qian evaded UK authorities for approximately six years after the 2018 raid. She disappeared from the UK in 2020 but later returned and enlisted the help of Seng Hok Ling, a 47-year-old Malaysian national based in Matlock, Derbyshire, to assist with transferring and laundering her remaining cryptocurrency. In February and April 2024, Qian transferred a total of approximately 83.7 Bitcoin to wallets controlled by Ling, who converted these into Tether and other cryptocurrencies, with some funds transferred to bank accounts in the United Arab Emirates and others converted to cash in the UK.
