= Saint Kitts and Nevis–United States relations =

- Saint Kitts and Nevis: United States

Saint Kitts and Nevis–United States relations are bilateral relations between Saint Kitts and Nevis and the United States.

== History ==
Since St. Kitts and Nevis attained full independence in 1983, relations with the United States have been friendly. Alexander Hamilton, an important leader in the founding of the United States, was born in Charlestown, Nevis. The United States seeks to help St. Kitts and Nevis develop economically and to help strengthen its moderate, democratic, parliamentary form of government. St. Kitts and Nevis is a beneficiary of the U.S. Caribbean Basin Initiative. U.S. assistance is primarily channeled through multilateral agencies such as the World Bank and the Caribbean Development Bank (CDB), as well as the USAID office in Bridgetown, Barbados. In addition, St. Kitts and Nevis benefits from U.S. military exercises and humanitarian civic action construction projects.

St. Kitts and Nevis is strategically placed in the Leeward Islands, near maritime transport lanes of major importance to the United States. St. Kitts and Nevis' location close to Puerto Rico and the U.S. Virgin Islands makes the two-island federation attractive to narcotics traffickers. To counter this threat, the Government of St. Kitts and Nevis cooperates with the United States in the fight against illegal narcotics. In 1995, the Government signed a maritime law enforcement treaty with the United States, later amended with an overflight/order-to-land amendment in 1996. St. Kitts and Nevis also signed an updated extradition treaty with the United States in 1996, and a mutual legal assistance treaty in 1997.

St. Kitts and Nevis is a popular American tourist destination. In the aftermath of the September 11, 2001 attacks, tourism declined, but the islands have seen growing numbers of visitors in recent years. Fewer than 1,000 U.S. citizens reside on the island, although students and staff of Ross University School of Veterinary Medicine and the Medical University of the Americas - Nevis constitute a significant population of U.S. citizens.

== Embassies ==
The United States maintains no official presence in St. Kitts and Nevis. The ambassador and embassy officers are resident in Barbados and frequently travel to St. Kitts and Nevis. A U.S. consular agent residing in nearby Antigua, however, assists U.S. citizens in St. Kitts and Nevis.

== See also ==
- North American Union
- North American Free Trade Agreement
- Free Trade Area of the Americas
- Third Border Initiative
- Caribbean Community
- Caribbean Basin Initiative (CBI)
- Caribbean Basin Trade Partnership Act
- Western Hemisphere Travel Initiative
- Foreign relations of the United States
- Foreign relations of Saint Kitts and Nevis
