= Demographics of Saint Kitts and Nevis =

Census population and average annual growth rate
| Year | Pop. | ±% p.a. |
|---|---|---|
| 1871 | 39,872 | — |
| 1881 | 41,001 | +0.28% |
| 1891 | 43,981 | +0.70% |
| 1901 | 42,556 | −0.33% |
| 1911 | 39,498 | −0.74% |
| 1921 | 33,974 | −1.50% |
| 1946 | 41,206 | +0.77% |
| 1960 | 51,023 | +1.54% |
| 1970 | 44,884 | −1.27% |
| 1980 | 43,291 | −0.36% |
| 1991 | 40,618 | −0.58% |
| 2001 | 46,325 | +1.32% |
| 2011 | 47,195 | +0.19% |
| 2022 | 51,320 | +0.76% |

Demographics of the population of Saint Kitts and Nevis include population density, ethnicity, religious affiliations and other aspects.

== Population ==
According to the 2001 census the combined population of Saint Kitts and Nevis was 46,325 (compared to 40,613 in 1991), of which 35,217 were in Saint Kitts and 11,108 in Nevis.

The population of St Kitts and Nevis in 2011 was 46,398. The estimated population of 2021 is 47,606 (the 2022 revision of the World Population Prospects).

== Vital statistics ==
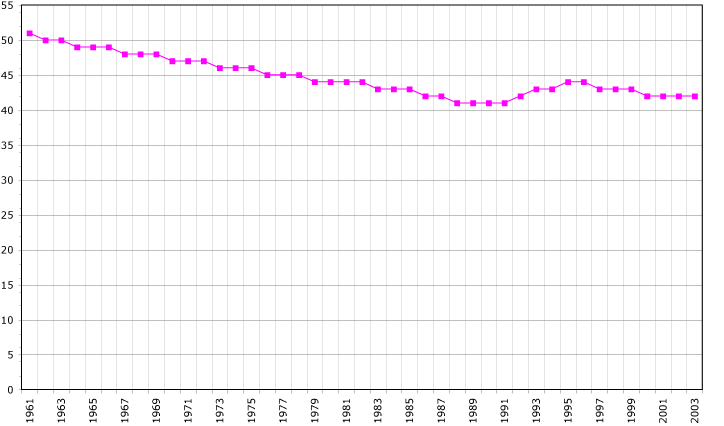
Demographics of Saint Kitts and Nevis, Data of FAO, year 2005; Number of inhabitants in thousands.

| | Average population | Live births | Deaths | Natural change | Crude birth rate (per 1000) | Crude death rate (per 1000) | Natural change (per 1000) | Infant mortality rate | Fertility Rate |
|---|---|---|---|---|---|---|---|---|---|
| 1967 | 47,000 | 1,502 | 445 | 1,057 | 31.7 | 9.4 | 22.3 | | |
| 1968 | 46,000 | 1,348 | 443 | 905 | 29.1 | 9.5 | 19.5 | | |
| 1969 | 46,000 | 1,226 | 414 | 812 | 26.9 | 9.1 | 17.8 | | |
| 1970 | 45,000 | 1,156 | 488 | 668 | 25.8 | 10.9 | 14.9 | | |
| 1971 | 44,000 | 1,107 | 439 | 668 | 24.9 | 9.9 | 15.0 | | |
| 1972 | 44,000 | 1,236 | 541 | 695 | 27.9 | 12.2 | 15.7 | | |
| 1973 | 44,000 | 1,186 | 525 | 661 | 26.8 | 11.8 | 14.9 | | |
| 1974 | 44,000 | 1,143 | 510 | 633 | 25.8 | 11.5 | 14.3 | | |
| 1975 | 44,000 | 1,099 | 427 | 672 | 24.8 | 9.6 | 15.2 | | |
| 1976 | 44,000 | 1,320 | 476 | 844 | 29.9 | 10.8 | 19.1 | | |
| 1977 | 44,000 | 1,212 | 502 | 710 | 27.6 | 11.4 | 16.2 | | |
| 1978 | 44,000 | 1,059 | 466 | 593 | 24.2 | 10.7 | 13.6 | | |
| 1979 | 43,000 | 1,211 | 529 | 682 | 27.9 | 12.2 | 15.7 | | |
| 1980 | 43,000 | 1,170 | 493 | 677 | 27.1 | 11.4 | 15.7 | | |
| 1981 | 43,000 | 1,138 | 450 | 688 | 26.5 | 10.5 | 16.0 | | |
| 1982 | 43,000 | 1,307 | 503 | 804 | 30.6 | 11.8 | 18.8 | | |
| 1983 | 43,000 | 1,093 | 478 | 615 | 25.7 | 11.2 | 14.5 | | |
| 1984 | 42,000 | 1,115 | 481 | 634 | 26.4 | 11.4 | 15.0 | | |
| 1985 | 42,000 | 1,026 | 441 | 585 | 24.4 | 10.5 | 13.9 | | |
| 1986 | 42,000 | 1,007 | 461 | 546 | 24.2 | 11.1 | 13.1 | | |
| 1987 | 41,000 | 947 | 462 | 485 | 22.9 | 11.2 | 11.7 | | |
| 1988 | 41,000 | 944 | 465 | 479 | 23.0 | 11.3 | 11.7 | | |
| 1989 | 41,000 | 989 | 484 | 505 | 24.2 | 11.8 | 12.4 | | |
| 1990 | 41,000 | 966 | 452 | 514 | 23.7 | 11.1 | 12.6 | | |
| 1991 | 41,000 | 915 | 397 | 518 | 22.3 | 9.7 | 12.6 | | |
| 1992 | 41,000 | 841 | 386 | 455 | 20.3 | 9.3 | 11.0 | | |
| 1993 | 42,000 | 849 | 391 | 458 | 20.3 | 9.3 | 10.9 | | |
| 1994 | 42,000 | 909 | 400 | 509 | 21.5 | 9.4 | 12.0 | | |
| 1995 | 43,000 | 797 | 385 | 412 | 18.6 | 9.0 | 9.6 | | |
| 1996 | 43,000 | 833 | 472 | 361 | 19.2 | 10.9 | 8.3 | | |
| 1997 | 44,000 | 875 | 393 | 482 | 19.9 | 9.0 | 11.0 | | |
| 1998 | 44,000 | 865 | 390 | 475 | 19.5 | 8.8 | 10.7 | | |
| 1999 | 45,000 | 864 | 418 | 446 | 19.2 | 9.3 | 9.9 | | |
| 2000 | 46,000 | 838 | 357 | 481 | 18.4 | 7.8 | 10.6 | | |
| 2001 | 46,000 | 803 | 352 | 451 | 17.4 | 7.6 | 9.8 | | |
| 2002 | 47,000 | | | | | | | | |
| 2003 | 48,000 | | | | | | | | |
| 2004 | 48,000 | | | | | | | | |
| 2005 | 49,350 | 668 | 362 | 302 | 13.5 | 7.3 | 6.2 | 13.5 | 1.93 |
| 2006 | 49,990 | 662 | 373 | 289 | 13.2 | 7.5 | 5.8 | 21.1 | 1.91 |
| 2007 | 50,640 | 690 | 356 | 334 | 13.6 | 7.0 | 6.6 | 20.3 | 1.95 |
| 2008 | 51,300 | 709 | 376 | 333 | 13.8 | 7.3 | 6.5 | 14.1 | 1.95 |
| 2009 | 51,970 | 749 | 353 | 396 | 14.4 | 6.8 | 7.6 | 20.0 | 2.08 |
| 2010 | 52,650 | 656 | 346 | 310 | 13.9 | 6.6 | | 18.3 | 1.76 |
| 2011 | 46,398 | 666 | 372 | 294 | 14.1 | 8.0 | 4.5 | 12.0 | 1.76 |
| 2012 | | 637 | 336 | 301 | 13.4 | 7.2 | 6.5 | 9.4 | 1.71 |
| 2013 | | 546 | 348 | 198 | 11.5 | 7.5 | 4.3 | 18.3 | 1.54 |
| 2014 | | 642 | 411 | 231 | 13.4 | 8.9 | 4.9 | 21.8 | 1.7 |
| 2015 | | 632 | | | 13.1 | | | | 1.68 |
| 2016 | | 676 | 402 | 274 | 14.0 | | | | 1.75 |
| 2017 | 48,614 | 648 | 376 | 272 | 13.3 | 7.7 | 5.6 | 17.0 | 1.67 |
| 2018 | 48,857 | 593 | 407 | 186 | 12.1 | 8.3 | 3.8 | 27.0 | 1.53 |
| 2019 | 49,101 | 594 | 366 | 228 | 12.1 | 7.5 | 4.6 | 16.8 | 1.52 |
| 2020 | 49,347 | 632 | 377 | 255 | 12.8 | 7.6 | 5.2 | 12.7 | 1.57 |
| 2021 | 49,593 | 617 | 454 | 163 | 12.4 | 9.2 | 3.2 | 14.6 | 1.53 |
| 2022 | 49,841 | 500 | 462 | 38 | 10.0 | 9.3 | 0.7 | 12.0 | 1.35 |
| 2023 | 50,090 | 481 | 482 | -1 | 9.6 | 9.6 | -0.0 | 8.3 | 1.29 |

== Age Structure ==
| Age group | Male | Female | Total | % |
|---|---|---|---|---|
| Total | 25 000 | 26 320 | 51 320 | 100 |
| 0–4 | 1 407 | 1 398 | 2 805 | 5.47 |
| 5–9 | 1 686 | 1 668 | 3 354 | 6.54 |
| 10–14 | 1 866 | 1 715 | 3 581 | 6.98 |
| 15–19 | 1 735 | 1 633 | 3 368 | 6.56 |
| 20–24 | 1 954 | 2 088 | 4 042 | 7.88 |
| 25–29 | 2 047 | 2 369 | 4 416 | 8.60 |
| 30–34 | 1 960 | 2 208 | 4 168 | 8.12 |
| 35–39 | 1 900 | 2 096 | 3 996 | 7.79 |
| 40–44 | 1 789 | 1 941 | 3 730 | 7.29 |
| 45–49 | 1 680 | 1 853 | 3 533 | 6.88 |
| 50–54 | 1 650 | 1 659 | 3 309 | 6.45 |
| 55–59 | 1 561 | 1 613 | 3 174 | 6.18 |
| 60–64 | 1 359 | 1 423 | 2 782 | 5.42 |
| 65–69 | 1 091 | 1 102 | 2 193 | 4.27 |
| 70–74 | 619 | 586 | 1 205 | 2.35 |
| 75–79 | 354 | 415 | 769 | 1.50 |
| 80–84 | 208 | 276 | 484 | 0.94 |
| 85–89 | 82 | 166 | 248 | 0.48 |
| 90–94 | 39 | 86 | 125 | 0.24 |
| 95–99 | 11 | 19 | 30 | 0.06 |
| 100+ | 2 | 6 | 8 | 0.02 |
| Age group | Male | Female | Total | Percent |
| 0–14 | 4 959 | 4 781 | 9 740 | 18.98 |
| 15–64 | 17 635 | 18 883 | 36 518 | 71.16 |
| 65+ | 2 406 | 2 656 | 5 062 | 9.86 |

== Ethnic groups ==
The population of Saint Kitts and Nevis, is predominantly African (92.7%) or mixed (2.2%). 2.2% of the population is white and 1% East Indian. In 2001, sixteen people belonged to the Amerindian population (0.03% of the total population). The remaining 0.7% of the population includes people from the Middle East (0.05%) and Chinese (0.09%).

== Languages ==
English is the country's sole official language, but the main spoken language is Saint Kitts Creole English.

- Caribbean English

== Religion ==
According to the 2011 census, 17% of the population is Anglican, 16% Methodist, 11% Pentecostal, 7% Church of God, 6% Roman Catholic, 5% each Baptist, Moravian, Seventh-day Adventist, and Wesleyan Holiness, 4% "Other", and 2% each Brethren, evangelical Christian, and Hindu.

- Anglican Diocese of the North East Caribbean and Aruba
- Catholic Diocese of Saint John's–Basseterre

The previous census showed that other religious groups included the Rastafarian Movement (1.6% of the population), Muslims (0.3%), Hinduism (0.8%), and the Baháʼí Faith (0.04%).In 2023, Saint Kitts and Nevis was scored 4 out of 4 for religious freedom.

According to 2011 census, there are 244 Muslims constituting approximately 1.9% of the population in Saint Kitts and Nevis. There are two Islamic centres/mosques and several Islamic organisations in the islands. Muslim Student Organisations are also present in the local universities like the Windsor University School of Medicine.
