= Ministry of Foreign Affairs (Saint Kitts and Nevis) =

Saint Kitts and Nevis Ministry of Foreign Affairs

Coordinates: 17.295387°N 62.725113°W

Saint Kitts and Nevis Ministry of Foreign Affairs
- Coat of arms of Saint Kitts and Nevis

Agency overview
- Jurisdiction: Saint Kitts and Nevis
- Headquarters: Church Street, Basseterre
- Annual budget: 5 million
- Agency executives: Denzil Douglas, Minister of Foreign Affairs, Economic Development, International Trade, Investment and Commerce; Kaye Bass, Permanent Secretary
- Website: foreign.gov.kn

The Ministry of Foreign Affairs is the ministry responsible for handling the Federation of Saint Kitts and Nevis' external relations and its diplomatic missions abroad. The ministry's current director is Minister of Foreign Affairs and Aviation, Denzil Douglas.

== Diplomacy ==
Although Saint Kitts and Nevis maintains formal and friendly ties with many of its neighbors and major regional and world powers, countries such as the United States do not have permanent representatives on the islands. The U.S. State Department, for example, has ambassadors and consular staff present in nearby Barbados and Antigua.

== List of ministers ==
This is a list of ministers of foreign affairs of Saint Kitts and Nevis:

- 1983–1995: Kennedy Simmonds
- 1995–2000: Denzil Douglas
- 2000–2001: Sam Condor
- 2001–2008: Timothy Harris
- 2008–2010: Denzil Douglas
- 2010–2013: Sam Condor
- 2013–2015: Patrice Nisbett
- 2015–2022: Mark Brantley
- 2022: Vincent Byron
- 2022–present: Denzil Douglas

== See also ==
- Foreign relations of Saint Kitts and Nevis
- List of diplomatic missions of Saint Kitts and Nevis
