= Mexico–Saint Kitts and Nevis relations =

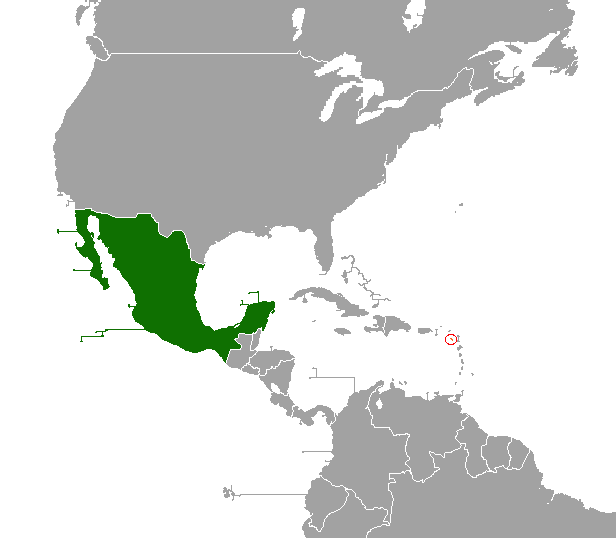

- Mexico: Saint Kitts and Nevis

The nations of Mexico and Saint Kitts and Nevis established diplomatic relations in 1990. Both nations are members of the Association of Caribbean States, Community of Latin American and Caribbean States, Organization of American States and the United Nations.

== History ==
Mexico and Saint Kitts and Nevis established diplomatic relations on 31 July 1990. Since the establishment of diplomatic relations, relations between both nations have taken place primarily in multilateral forums. In February 2010, Kittitian Prime Minister Denzil Douglas paid a visit to Cancún to attend the Mexico-Caribbean Community (CARICOM) summit.

In 2013, as a favor to Prime Minister Denzil Douglas, Mexico financed and supervised the construction of two police stations in the towns of Dieppe Bay Town and Tabernacle with a total cost of US$1.3 million. The project concluded in 2014. In May 2014, Kittitian Prime Minister Denzil Douglas traveled to Mexico to attend the Mexico-Caribbean Community summit in Mérida. In May 2015, Mexico opened an honorary consulate in Basseterre.

In June 2017, Kittitian Foreign Minister Mark Brantley paid a visit to Mexico to attend the 47th General Assembly of the Organization of American States in Cancún. In 2023, both nations celebrated 33 years of diplomatic relations.

== High-level visits ==
High-level visits from Saint Kitts and Nevis to Mexico

- Prime Minister Denzil Douglas (2010, 2014)
- Foreign Minister Mark Brantley (2017)

== Bilateral agreements ==
Both nations have signed an Agreement for Scientific and Technical Cooperation (1999). Each year, the Mexican government offers scholarships for nationals of Saint Kitts and Nevis to study postgraduate studies at Mexican higher education institutions.

== Trade ==
In 2023, trade between Mexico and Saint Kitts and Nevis totaled US$5 million. Mexico's main exports to Saint Kitts and Nevis include: refrigerators and freezers, furniture, stoves, alcohol, chemical based products, and oil. Saint Kitts and Nevis's main exports to Mexico include: power transformers, parts and accessories for machines, x-ray machines, parts for motor vehicles, brooms and brushes. Mexican multinational company, Cemex operates in Saint Kitts and Nevis.

== Diplomatic missions ==
- Mexico is accredited to Saint Kitts and Nevis from its embassy in Castries, Saint Lucia and maintains an honorary consulate in Basseterre.
- Saint Kitts and Nevis is accredited to Mexico from its embassy in Washington, D.C., United States.
