= List of diplomatic missions of Saint Kitts and Nevis =

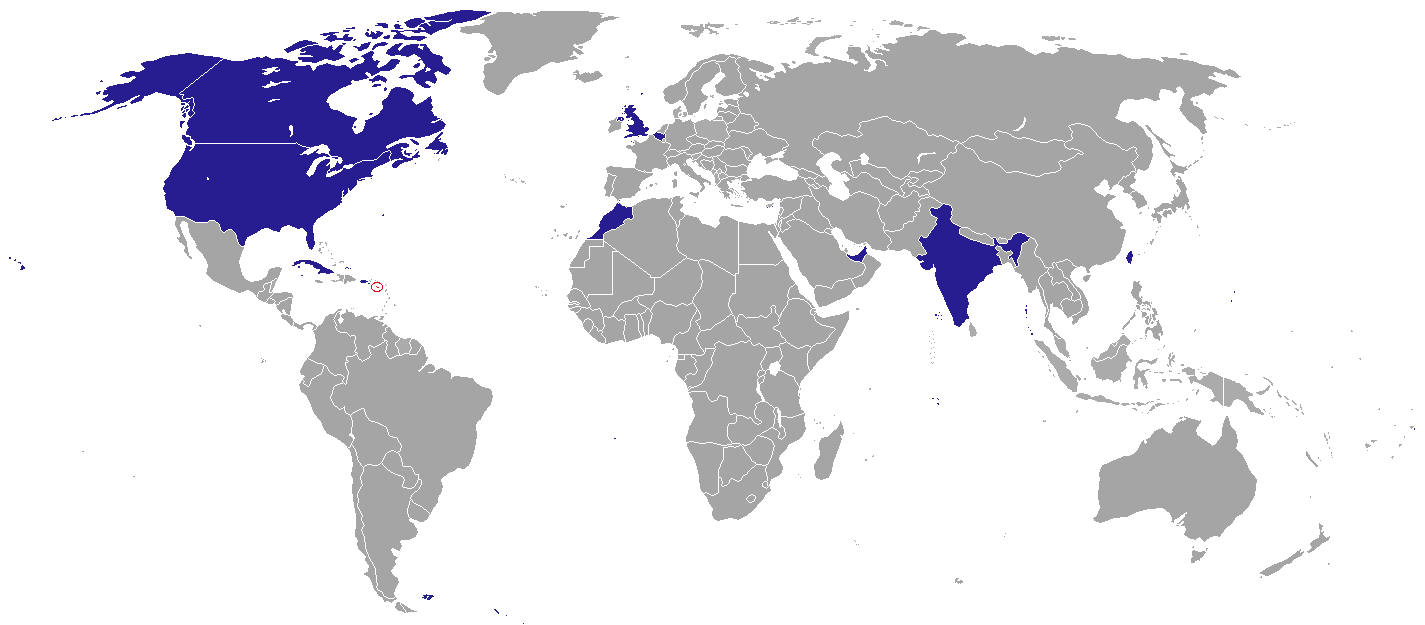
Diplomatic missions of Saint Kitts and Nevis

This is a list of diplomatic missions of Saint Kitts and Nevis, which operate under the authority of the Kittitian Ministry of Foreign Affairs. The Caribbean island of Saint Kitts and Nevis has a modest diplomatic presence. Its embassy and mission to the European Union in Brussels and its embassy in Morocco is shared with other East Caribbean states. It recognizes the Republic of China and consequently has an embassy in Taipei.

== Current missions ==
=== Africa ===
Host country	Host city	Mission	Concurrent accreditation	Ref.
Morocco	Rabat	Embassy		

=== Americas ===
Host country	Host city	Mission	Concurrent accreditation	Ref.
Canada	Ottawa	High Commission		
Canada	Toronto	Consulate-General		
Cuba	Havana	Embassy		
United States	Washington, D.C.	Embassy	Countries: Mexico; Paraguay; International Organizations: Organization of American States	
United States	Los Angeles	Consulate-General	Countries: Mexico; Paraguay; International Organizations: Organization of American States	
United States	New York City	Consulate-General	Countries: Mexico; Paraguay; International Organizations: Organization of American States	
United States	Miami	Consulate	Countries: Mexico; Paraguay; International Organizations: Organization of American States	

=== Asia ===
Host country	Host city	Mission	Concurrent accreditation	Ref.
India	New Delhi	High Commission		
Republic of China (Taiwan)	Taipei	Embassy		
United Arab Emirates	Abu Dhabi	Embassy		

=== Europe ===
Host country	Host city	Mission	Concurrent accreditation	Ref.
Belgium	Brussels	Embassy		
United Kingdom	London	High Commission		

=== Multilateral organizations ===
Organization	Host city	Host country	Mission	Concurrent accreditation	Ref.
United Nations	New York City	United States	Permanent Mission	Countries: Guatemala	

== Gallery ==
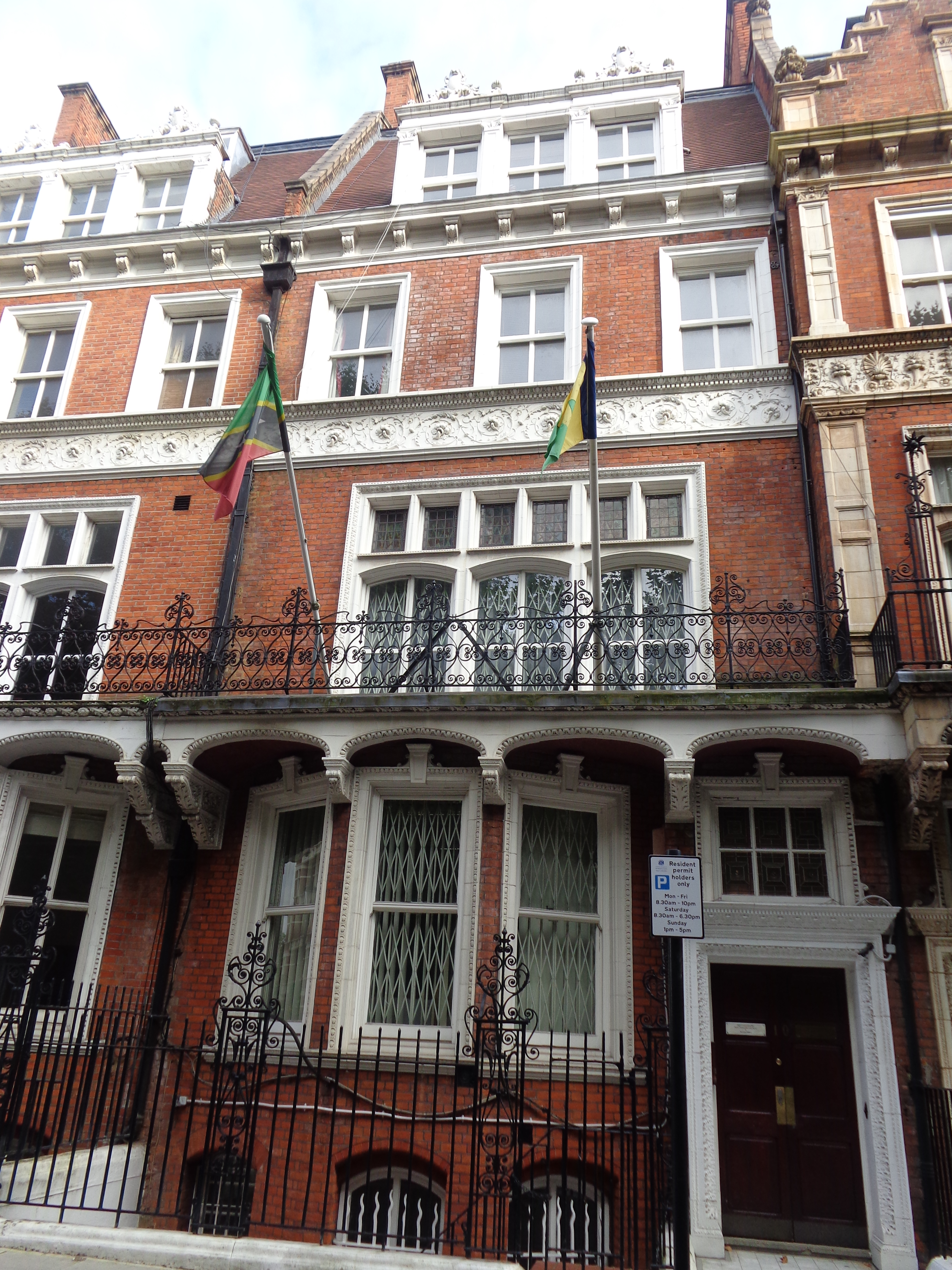
High Commission in London

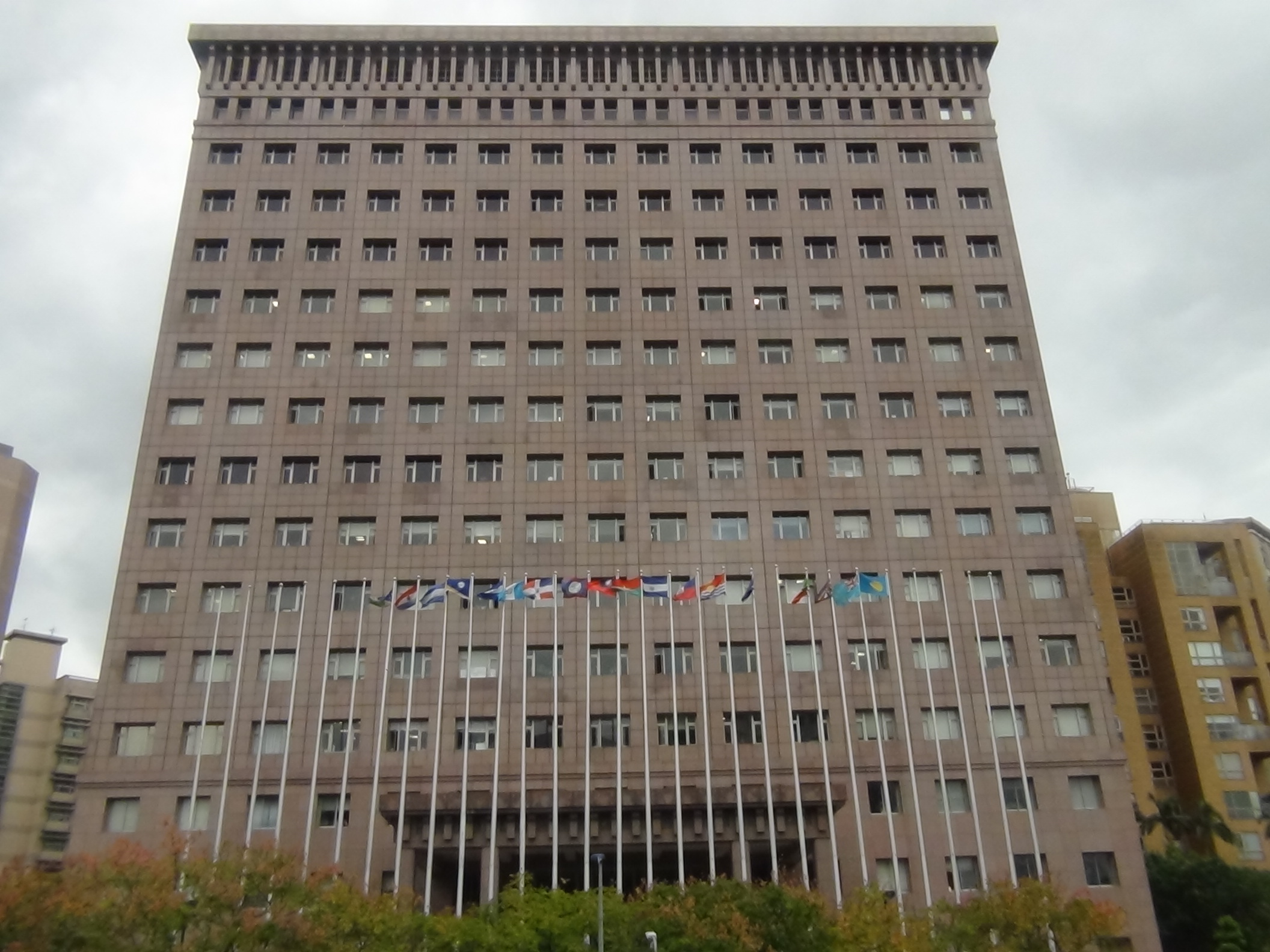
Embassy in Taipei

== Mission to open ==
Host country	Host city	Mission	Ref.
Singapore	Singapore	High Commission	

== See also ==
- Foreign relations of Saint Kitts and Nevis
- Ministry of Foreign Affairs (Saint Kitts and Nevis)
