= Indians in Saint Kitts and Nevis =

Ethnic group

The Indian community in Saint Kitts and Nevis is made up of Indo-Kittitians, Indo-Nevisians, non-resident Indians and persons of Indian origin. Indo-Kittitians and Indo-Nevisians are nationals of Saint Kitts and Nevis whose ancestry lies within the country of India. The community originated from the Indian indentured workers brought to Saint Kitts and Nevis by the British in 1861 and 1874 respectively. By 1884, most of the community had emigrated to Caribbean nations with larger Indian populations such as Trinidad and Tobago, Guyana and Suriname.

In recent years, the Indian population of Saint Kitts and Nevis has witnessed a gradual increase, as a result of immigration by Indo-Caribbeans particularly Indo-Guyanese. Some Indian Sindhi businessmen have also moved to the country recently. According to the 2001 Census of Saint Kitts and Nevis, the population of Indian people in the country rose from 0.7% in 1991 to 1.5% in 2001. They were the third largest ethnic group in country, after Africans (92.4%) and people of mixed race (3%). The 2001 Census recorded 443 East Indian males and 266 East Indian females in the country.

== Indenture ==
Following the abolition of slavery in the British West Indies on 1 August 1838, plantation owners in the region sought to find an alternative to African slave labour. The British began transporting indentured workers from India to work on plantation estates in Saint Kitts and Nevis, which had become British colony in 1713. Saint Kitts and Nevis were the last among British and French colonies to introduce Indian indentured labour. Nevis received 315 Indian indentured workers, the smallest among all the colonies that employed indentured labour. Saint Kitts received the third smallest number (337 workers), after the Dutch colony of St. Croix which received 321 Indian workers. Limited information exists on indentured workers in Saint Kitts. A register that kept records of indentured workers was lost in a fire at the Court House in Saint Kitts in 1982. Some documents related to indentured workers are held at the National Archives in Saint Kitts.

=== Saint Kitts ===
The only ship that carried indentured workers from India to Saint Kitts, the Dartmouth, departed from Calcutta on 26 February 1861 and arrived in Saint Kitts on 3 June 1861. The details of the passengers on the ship at the time of departure were recorded in an entry made in the report by Captain Eales, the Protector of Emigrants in the Protector's Office at Fort William in Calcutta, India. The entry, dated 28 May 1861, records that the ship had departed with 361 Indians on board - 192 men, 113 women, 17 boys, 24 girls and 13 infants under the age of two. The report also notes that four Indians died of cholera around the time of departure. However, it does not account for two passengers. The St. Christopher Advertiser and Weekly Intelligencer reported that the Dartmouth docked at St. Kitts on 3 June 1861 with 337 Indians on board - 186 men, 103 women, 13 boys, 10 girls and 10 male and 15 female infants. The difference between the figures indicates that 20 Indians died during the voyage.

Eales' report provides information about the origin and age of the passengers. According to the report, the passengers came from the areas of Sahebgunge or Gya Jharkhand (85 immigrants), Ranchi Jharkhand (84), Pooroolea Bengal (40), Hazareebaugh Jharkhand (33), Arrah or Shahabad Bihar (25), and Patna, Azimabad, Jellasore or Monghyr Bihar (22). The report records that 139 passenger were aged between 20 and 30 years, 71 were aged between 30 and 40 years, and the remaining 151 immigrants were either below the age of 20 or above the age of 40.

Upon arriving in Saint Kitts, the indentured workers were assigned to estates except for six who were directly admitted at the Colonial Hospital. Five of the admitted workers died at the hospital. The largest group of workers, around 29, were sent to Dewar Estate, and the smallest group of four workers was assigned to Mansion Estate. The West Farm, Dupuys, and Golden Rock estates received more female Indian workers than males. West Farm received 10 females and 8 males, Dupuys got 6 females and 5 males, and Golden Rock received 4 females and 3 males. On average, the 25 estates received an average of 13 indentured Indian labourers each. Shortly after the assignments, around 7 Indian workers died - 2 adults from Con Phipps estate, 1 person from Stone Castle estate, 1 child from Needsmust estate, and 1 child and 1 infant from Dewar. An infant that had been born during the voyage, and assigned to Helden estate, also died. During the same period, four Indian children were born on the island.

There were some reported instances of Indian indentured labourers refusing to work. The Masters and Servants Act of 1849 mandated that indentured labourers were required work from the moment they agreed to work for a plantation owner, but did not require the agreement to be in writing. An article in the St. Christopher Advertiser and Weekly Intelligencer published on 5 November 1861 states, "Bramandat (a coolie) was charged by Mr Solomon Shelford with breach of his contract as a labourer. It appeared from the evidence that the defendant refused to do the work ordered, had not worked for a week. Defendant said that he would not do the work ordered (weed canes) but would do other work. He was committed to goal there to be kept to hard labour for 30 days." On 12 November 1861, the same newspaper reported that two workers named Dheajan and Shampod were charged with breach of contract by S.H. Richardson for refusing to work and were ordered to pay a fine of 5 shillings each (equivalent to £62 in 2025).

Within four years of arriving in Saint Kitts, most of the workers converted from Hinduism and Islam to Christianity. They also began adopting Christian names. The Colonial Report, St. Kitts, 1868, FCOL states that only a "handful" of Indians were indentured in St. Kitts in 1868. The estimated 10 Indians who were still indentured are presumed to have re-indentured, as the original indenture period was five years. The report also emphasizes the "great exodus" of Indians from Saint Kitts to Guyana and Trinidad. Twenty-two Indians died during their indenture period in Saint Kitts. Sixty-three Indians emigrated to Trinidad and Guyana after completing their indenture periods.

In the 1860s, the decade that Indians arrived in Saint Kitts, they accounted for about 5% of the island's total population. By 1887, the Indian population in Saint Kitts had declined by 82% and there were only 61 Indians still residing in Saint Kitts, or 0.2% of the island's total population. According to the 1921 Census of Saint Kitts, there were 21 India-born people in the country indicating that most of the Indian immigrants had left Saint Kitts. The Census did not provide figures for ethnic makeup of the population, but only noted the birthplace of respondents. Therefore, it provides no information on the total Indian population of Saint Kitts in 1921, which would include Indians born on the island.

=== Nevis ===
The only ship that carried indentured workers from India to Nevis, the Syria, departed from Calcutta and arrived in Nevis on 30 March 1874 with 315 Indians on board. The Government of Nevis enacted Acts on 24 March and 9 April 1874 to raise funds to import the workers. In 1874, £4,993 (equivalent to £488,157 in 2025) of the government's total annual expenditure of £11,149 (equivalent to £1,090,019 in 2025) was allocated for facilitating the immigration of Indian labour. Upon arriving, Indian indentured labourers were assigned to estates across Nevis. According to a written reply to an enquiry from the Guiana Emigration Agency at 8 Garden Reach, Calcutta, which was responsible for emigration of Indians to Nevis, acting President John Kemys Spencer-Churchill declared that all Indian immigrants were freed from indentureship in April 1879. Some Indian labourers broke their contracts before the five-year indenture period ended so that they could migrate to Trinidad. Others emigrated after completing their contracts. No Indian workers in Nevis chose to re-indenture after completing their initial five-year contract, however, many chose to remain in Nevis as free workers.

Indians faced many legal issues in Nevis in the years following their arrival. Court records from 1874 and 1875 show that over 120 Indians were convicted of various offences, most often for breaching their contract. However, convictions of Indians reduced to 27 in 1880 suggesting that they had begun to assimilate and integrate with Nevisian society.

Around 20% of Indian immigrants to Nevis returned to India by 1890.

== Present day ==
Historians regard the Indians of Saint Kitts and Nevis as a "lost" population, as little is known about the descendants of the Indian indentured workers who arrived in the country. This can be attributed to the small number of Indians brought to Saint Kitts and Nevis as compared to other colonies in the Caribbean. Historian Kumar Mahabir states, "The small number of Indians in St. Kitts was a major contributor to their disappearance, physiologically and culturally." This is a common phenomenon among Indo-Caribbeans in nations with small Indian populations. Indo-Caribbeans in countries with larger populations such as Trinidad, Guyana and Suriname maintain Indian cultural and religious practices even today.

The small number of immigrants, inter-marriages, mass exodus of Indians from Saint Kitts and Nevis to other Caribbean nations, and subsequent integration with the Indian community in those nations resulted in the "disappearance" of the Indo-Kittitian and Indo-Nevisian communities. Although Nevis received slightly less Indian immigrants than Saint Kitts, the former bears comparatively more traces of Indian heritage. Historian Bonham C. Richardson wrote in 1983, "Today in the late 20th century, the only noticeable vestige of this immigration on the two islands [Saint Kitts and Nevis] is a few Indian families in the Cotton Ground village area of Nevis north of Charlestown."

In recent years, the Indian population of Saint Kitts and Nevis has witnessed a gradual increase, as a result of immigration by Indo-Caribbeans to the country particularly Indo-Guyanese. Some Indian Sindhi businessmen have also moved to the country recently. According to the 2001 Census of Saint Kitts and Nevis, the population of East Indian people in the country rose from 0.7% in 1991 to 1.5% in 2001. They were the third largest ethnic group in country, after Africans (92.4%) and people of mixed race (3%). The 2001 Census recorded 443 East Indian males and 266 East Indian females in the country. Indian cuisine has had a significant influence on Saint Kitts and Nevis, and Indian food such roti, goat curry, pork curry, mutton curry and vegetable curries are a common part of Kittitian and Nevisian cuisines.

== See also ==
- India–Saint Kitts and Nevis relations
