= Saint Kitts and Nevis passport =

Passport issued to citizens of Saint Kitts and Nevis

- Front cover of a Saint Kitts and Nevis passport.
- Type: Passport
- Issued by: Saint Kitts and Nevis
- First issued: 11 November 2010 (current version)
- Purpose: Identification
- Eligibility: Kittitian and Nevisian citizens
- Expiration: 10 years
- Cost: $250 XCD for adults 16-64 years old (ordinary passport); $150 XCD for under 16 & over 65 years old (ordinary passport); $675 XCD for Citizenship by Investment

The Saint Kitts and Nevis passport is issued to citizens of Saint Kitts and Nevis for international travel. Prior to 1983, Saint Kitts and Nevis, together with Anguilla, was an associated state of the United Kingdom. The passport is a Caricom passport as Saint Kitts and Nevis is a member of the Caribbean Community. As of 29 July 2023, citizens of Saint Kitts and Nevis had visa-free or visa on arrival access (including eTAs) to 154 countries and territories.

== Citizenship by investment program ==
In 1984, Saint Kitts and Nevis introduced an immigrant investor program, and as of March 2015, the country is the most popular place to acquire citizenship through investment, which includes the right to a passport. The minimum cost for a single applicant to acquire citizenship is US$250,000, with additional costs being levied for each eligible family member the applicant wishes to include. Applicants must complete a background and due diligence check process, as well as various other legal requirements. Once successfully vetted and granted citizenship, they can apply for a passport. There is no requirement to live in the country, although an interview is required as well as an eventual visit to the country (or embassy). Additionally, there is no tax on citizens' individual income (including capital gains).

In May 2014, the Financial Crimes Enforcement Network (FinCEN) issued a warning that St. Kitts and Nevis had granted passports to foreign individuals who had abused the Citizenship-by-Investment program sponsored "for the purpose of engaging in illicit financial activity." In November 2014, Canada announced it was requiring St. Kitts and Nevis citizens to obtain a visa from 22 November 2014, due to concerns about “identity management practices within its Citizenship by Investment program.” Following the announcement, the government of St. Kitts and Nevis initiated a recall on all biometric passports issued between January 2012 and July 2014, and replaced them with new passports which showed the holder's place of birth as well as any previous name changes. Canada subsequently reinstated visa-free (eTA) travel by air for any St. Kitts and Nevis citizens who have either held a Canadian visa within 10 years prior to their arrival, or who currently hold a valid United States non-immigrant visa. The US government formally rescinded its FinCEN notice in February, 2026.

The St. Kitts and Nevis Citizenship-by-Investment program is one of the longest-standing programs of its kind in the world. The country opened its doors to foreign investors in 1984. Since then, they have continued to offer their citizenship to those that are qualified and who have donated a significant amount of capital into the economy. St. Kitts and Nevis also offers a fast-track service to clients, including the issuance of passports which previously had been subject to lengthy delays.

== Visa requirements ==
As of 23 August 2024, citizens of Saint Kitts and Nevis had visa-free or visa on arrival access (including eTAs) to 157 countries and territories, ranking the Saint Kitts and Nevis passport 23rd.

== See also ==
- CARICOM passport
- Anguillan passport
- Visa requirements for Saint Kitts and Nevis citizens
