= India–Saint Kitts and Nevis relations =

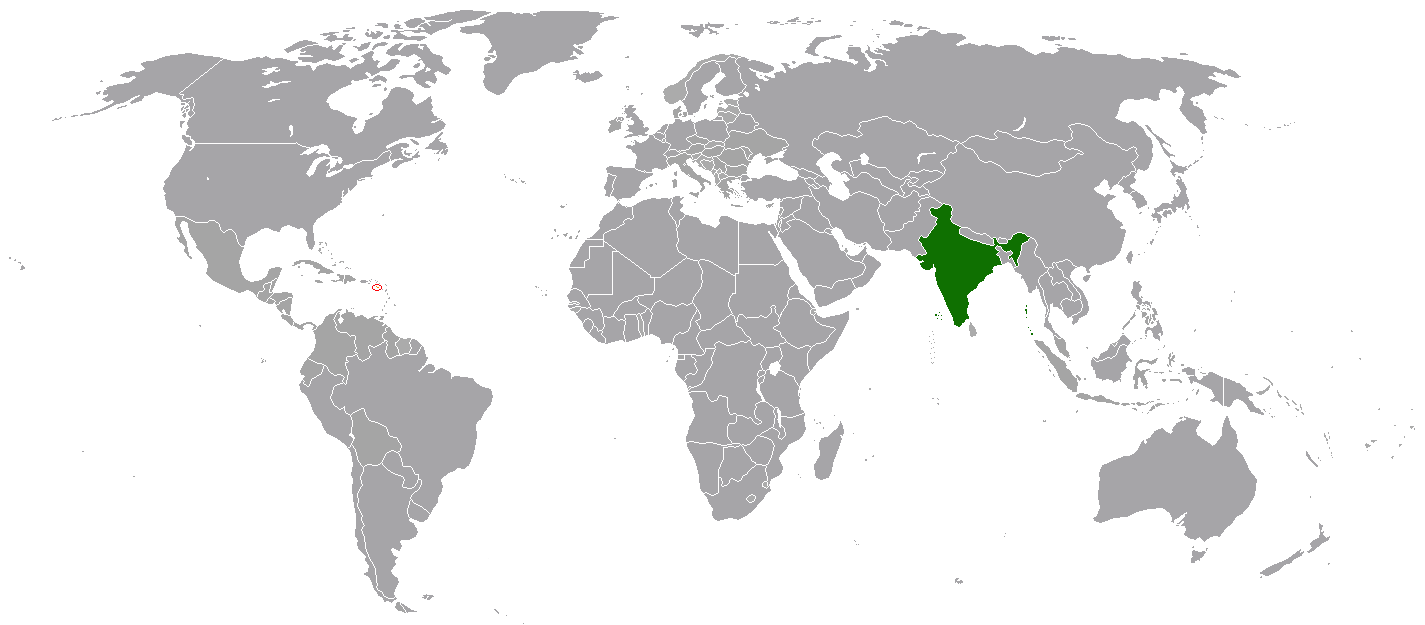
- India: Saint Kitts and Nevis

India–Saint Kitts and Nevis relations refers to the international relations that exist between India and Saint Kitts and Nevis. The High Commission of India in Georgetown, Guyana is concurrently accredited to Saint Kitts and Nevis. India opened its Honorary Consulate in Basseterre in August 2008.

== History ==
Relations between India and Saint Kitts and Nevis date back to the mid-19th century when both countries were British colonies. The first Indians in Saint Kitts arrived on 3 June 1861 on board the Dartmouth. The ship had departed from Calcutta on 26 February 1861 with 361 Indian indentured workers on board. Twenty-four Indians died during the voyage and only 337 would arrive in Saint Kitts. The first Indians in Nevis arrived on 30 March 1874 on board the Syria which carried 315 Indian labourers. These were the only two ships that transported Indian indentured workers to Saint Kitts and Nevis. About 20% of the immigrants returned to India by 1890. Most of the others emigrated to Caribbean nations with larger Indian populations such as Trinidad and Tobago, Guyana and Suriname. Very few remained in Saint Kitts and Nevis.

Saint Kitts was the focus of an alleged Indian government scandal in 1989–1990. On 20 August 1989, The Kuwait Times published a report claiming that Ajeya Singh, son of then-Indian Prime Minister V.P. Singh, held a bank account in Saint Kitts with $21 million of deposits. The beneficiary of the account was claimed to be the Prime Minister himself. The story was reprinted in Indian media within days. However, following investigations, the reports were found to be false and created to discredit V.P. Singh.

India and Saint Kitts and Nevis signed an MoU in July 2007, agreeing to hold regular Foreign Office Consultations. Prime Minister Denzil Douglas made an official working visit to India on 5–10 April 2012. He was accompanied by the Kittitian High Commissioner to the United Kingdom Kevin Isaac and other government officials. Douglas spent most of the visit in the state of Punjab visiting the Golden Temple in Amritsar and then holding talks with Indian businessmen and state and union government officials in Jalandhar. He also met with businessmen in Bath Castle, Ludhiana. Douglas also visited a hospital in Chandigarh and discussed measures to promote health tourism. He concluded his tour by visiting the Taj Mahal in Agra.

The promoter of Winsome Diamonds and Jewellery Ltd., Jatin Mehta, and his wife Sonia Mehta, became citizens of Saint Kitts and Nevis in 2013–14. Mehta is the second largest loan defaulter in India, and has a total debt of over ₹6,800 crore (US$710 million) with multiple banks including Standard Chartered and Punjab National Bank.

Minister of Ayush Shripad Yesso Naik visited Saint Kitts in October 2016 and participated in Diwali celebrations in the country.

== Economic relations ==
=== Trade ===
Bilateral trade between India and Saint Kitts and Nevis totaled US$2.36 million in 2015–16, recording a growth of 55.26% over the previous fiscal. India exported $2.20 million worth of goods to Saint Kitts and Nevis and imported $160,000. The main commodities exported from India to Saint Kitts and Nevis are pharmaceuticals, garments, and jewellery.

India and Saint Kitts and Nevis signed a Tax Information Exchange Agreement (TIEA) on 11 November 2014, which came into force on 2 February 2016.

=== Foreign aid ===
India donated ₹5 lakh (equivalent to ₹30 lakh or US$31,000 in 2023) towards disaster relief in the aftermath Hurricane Luis in 1995. Citizens of Saint Kitts and Nevis are eligible for scholarships under the Indian Technical and Economic Cooperation Programme.

== Indians in Saint Kitts and Nevis ==
According to the 2001 Census of Saint Kitts and Nevis, the population of East Indian people in the country rose from 0.7% in 1991 to 1.5% in 2001. They were the third largest ethnic group in country, after Africans (92.4%) and people of mixed race (3%). The 2001 Census recorded 443 East Indian males and 266 East Indian females in the country.

As of December 2016, an estimated 200-250 Indians reside in Saint Kitts and Nevis. The community is primarily involved in small businesses. The migration of Indian businessmen from St. Martin to St. Kitts has resulted in a steady increase in the size of the Indian community. Additionally, many foreign nationals of Indian origin are enrolled as students at the Windsor University School of Medicine in St. Kitts.
